= Bibliography of fly fishing (fly tying, stories, fiction) =

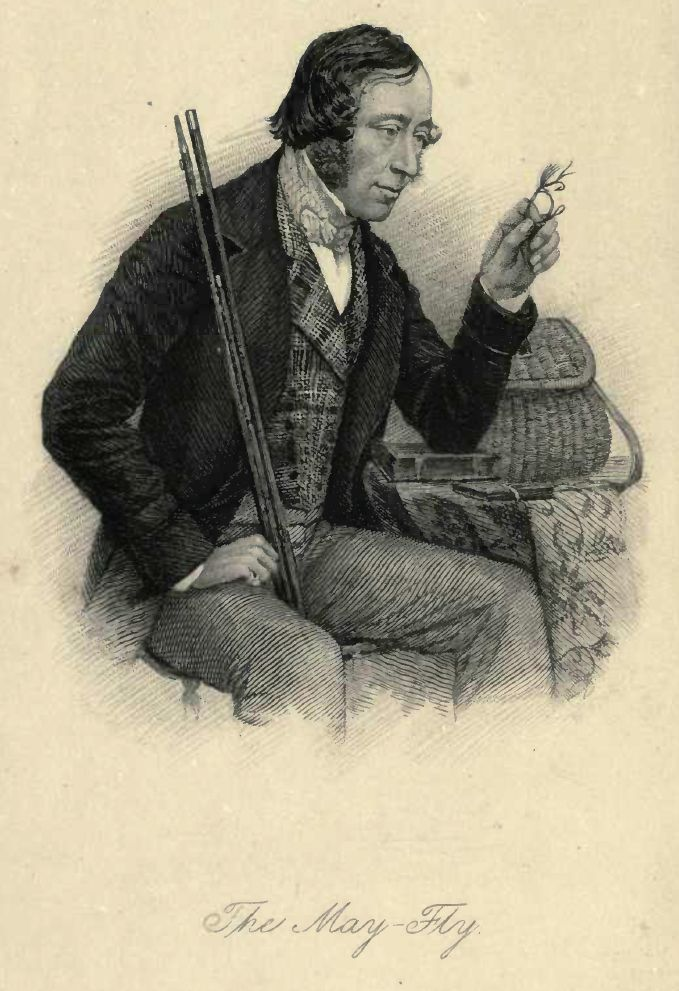
The May Fly – Spring Tide-The Angler and His Friends, George Akerman, London, (1852)

This annotated bibliography is intended to list both notable and not so notable works of English language, non-fiction and fiction related to the sport of fly fishing listed by year published. Although 100% of any book listed is not necessarily devoted to fly fishing, all these titles have significant fly fishing content. Included in this bibliography is a list of fly tying, fly tackle, regional guides, memoirs, stories and fly fishing fiction related literature.

- For readability, the bibliography is contained in three separate lists. For classic general texts, history of fly fishing and fly fishing library collections see: Bibliography of fly fishing
- For species related fly fishing literature see: Bibliography of fly fishing (species related)

== Annotations ==
Annotations may reflect descriptive comments from the book's dust jacket, third party reviews or personal, descriptive and qualitative comments by individuals who have read the book. Some older works have links to online versions in the Internet Archive or Google Books.

== Fly tying and patterns ==
=== 19th century ===
- Ronalds, Alfred (1836). The Fly-Fisher's Entomology. London: Longman, Orme, Brown, Green and Longmans.
- Blacker, William (1842). Blacker's Art of Fly Making. London: George Nichols., reprinted in 1855
- Soltau, G. W. (1847). Trout Flies of Devon and Cornwall (PDF). Plymouth, England: Edward Nettleton.
- Blacker, William (1855). Blacker's Art of Fly Making. London: Geo Nichols.

William Blacker (the Irishman who operated a tackle shop at 54 Dean Street, Soho, London) was acknowledged as one of the best trout and salmon fly dressers of this day. His fly dressing methods are described and illustrated in his book The Art of Fly-making which first appeared in 1842 and was reissued in 1843 and again in 1855

— Alec Jackson, The American Fly Fisher.

- Wade, Henry (1860). Rod-Fishing in Clear Waters By Fly, Minnow and Work With a Short and Easy method to the Art of Dressing Flies. London: Bell and Daldy. p. 132.
- Halford, F. M. (1886). Floating Flies and How to Dress Them. A Treatise on the Most Modern Methods of Dressing Artificial Flies for Trout and Grayling with Full Illustrated Directions and Containing Ninety Hand-Coloured Engravings of the Most Killing Patterns Together with a Few Hints to Dry-Fly Fishermen. London: Sampson, Low, Marston, Searle, and Rivington.
- Pritt, Thomas E. (1885). Yorkshire Trout Flies. Leeds: Goodall and Suddick.
- Pritt, Thomas E. (1886). North Country Flies (PDF). London: Sampson, Low, Marston, Searle & Rivington., According to Dr. Andrew Herd in The Fly, Pritt's work was the first comprehensive attempt to codify the completely different North Country school of fly tying using soft hackle wet flies.
- Ogden, James (1887). Ogden on Fly Tying (PDF). London: Sampson, Low, Marston, Searle & Rivington.
- Shipley, Malcolm A. (1888). Artificial Flies and How To Make Them (PDF). Philadelphia: Spangler & Davis.
- Theakston, Michael (1888). British Angling Flies (PDF). London: William Harrison.
- Theakston, Michael; Walbran, Francis M. (1888). British Angling Flies. London: Sampson Low, Marston, Searle, and Rivington.
- Shipley, M. A. (1888). Artificial Flies and How To Tie Them. Philadelphia, PA: Press of Spangler and Davis.
- Marbury, Mary Orvis (1892). Favorite Flies and Their Histories. Boston and New York: Houghton and Mifflin Company.
- Hale, John Henry (1892). How To Tie Salmon Flies (PDF). London: Sampson, Low, Marston & Company Ltd.
- Kelson, George M. (1895). The Salmon Fly and How to Dress It (PDF). London: Wyman & Sons.

The Salmon Fly enjoys a unique position in the literature of fly dressing since it brought order and system to the classification of salmon flies and the methodology of salmon fly dressing.

- Walker, Charles Edward (1897). Old Flies in New Dresses-How to dress Dry Flies with the wings in the natural position and some new Wet Flies (PDF). London: Lawrence and Bullen Ltd.

=== 20th century ===
==== 1900–1940s ====
- Skues, G.E.M (1910). Minor Tactics of the Chalk Stream. London: Adams and Charles Black.
- West, Leonard (1913). The Natural Trout Fly and Its Imitation. Ravenshead, St Helens: McCorquodale & Co., Ltd.
- Pryce-Tannatt, T. E. (1914). How To Dress Salmon Flies-A Handbook for Amateurs (PDF). London: Adam and Charles Black.
- La Branche, George M. L. (1914). The Dry Fly and Fast Water. New York: Charles Scribner's and Sons.
- Rhead, Louis (1919). American Trout Stream Insects-A Guide to Angling Flies and other Aquatic Insects Alluring to Trout. New York: Frederick A. Stokes and Co.
- McClelland, H. G. (1919). The Trout Fly Dresser's Cabinet of Devices or How To Tie Flies for Trout and Grayling Fishing. London: The Fishing Gazette.
- Skues, G.E.M (1921). The Way of a Trout with the Fly. London: A & C Black.
- Jennings, Preston J. (1935). A Book of Trout Flies. New York: Crown Publishers, Derrydale Press.
- Gregg, E. C. (1940). How To Tie Flies. New York: A. S. Barnes and Company.
- Smedley, Harold Hinsdale (1944). Fly Patterns and Their Origins. Muskegon, MI: Westshore Publications.

==== 1950–1970s ====
- Marinaro, Vincent C. (1950). A Modern Dry Fly Code. New York: G. P. Putnam Sons. ISBN 1558214135.
- Leonard, J. Edson (1950). Flies-Their Origin, Natural History, Tying, Hooks, Patterns and Selection of Dry and Wet Flies, Nymphs, Streamers, Salmon Flies for Fresh and Salt Water in North America and The British Isles including a dictionary of 2200 patterns. New York: A.S. Barnes and Company.* Harris, J. R. (1952). An Angler's Entomology. London: Collins. ISBN 978-0007308187. New Naturalist #23
- Schwiebert, Ernest G. Jr. (1955). Matching The Hatch-A Practical Guide to Imitation of Insects Found On Eastern and Western Trout Waters. Toronto, Canada: The MacMillan Company.
- Veniard, John (1960). How to Make Tube Flies. Thornton Heath: E. Veniard Ltd.
- Clegg, Thomas (1962). Tube-Flies and How to Make Them. Leamington Spa: S. & E. G. Messeena.
- Shaw, Helen (1963). Fly-tying – Materials, Tools and Techniques. New York: The Ronald Press Company.
- Clegg, Thomas (1965). Modern Tube Fly Making. Nottingham: Tom C. Saville.
- Bates, Joseph D. (1966). Streamer Fly Tying & Fishing. Harrisburg, Pennsylvania: Stackpole Books.
- Flick, Arthur B. (1967). The New Streamside Guide to Naturals and their Imitations. New York: Crown Publishers Inc.
- Bates, Joseph D. (1970). Atlantic Salmon Flies and Fishing. Harrisburg, PA: Stackpole Books. ISBN 0811701808.
- Richards, Carl; Swisher, Doug (1971). Selective Trout-A Dramatically New and Scientific Approach to Trout Fishing on Eastern and Western Rivers. New York: Crown Publishers.
- Cross, Reuben R. (1971). The Complete Fly Tier. Rockville Centre, New York: Freshlet Press.
- Jorgenson, Poul (1973). Dressing Flies For Fresh and Saltwater. Rockville Center, New York: Freshlet Press. ISBN 0883950227., introduction by Charles K. Fox, illustrations by the author, 8 color plates and numerous b/w photographs by Irv Swope, index.
- Schwiebert, Ernest (1973). Nymphs-A Complete Guide to Naturals and Imitations. New York: Winchester Press. ISBN 0876910746.
- Kreh, Lefty (1974). Fly Fishing in Saltwater. New York: Crown Publishers Inc.
- Nemes, Sylvester (1975). The Soft-Hackled Fly-A Trout Fisherman's Guide. Greenwich, Connecticut: Chatham Press. ISBN 0811716708.
- Slaymaker, S. R. II; Harvey, George (1976). Tie a Fly, Catch a Trout. New York: Harper & Row Publishers. ISBN 0060139838., the year is divided into two seasons – the season for tying flies and the season for angling with them. Sam Slaymaker writes with equal relish about tying flies by the fireplace and trying them out on the stream.
- Combs, Trey (1976). Steelhead Fly Fishing and Flies. Portland, Oregon: Frank Amato. ISBN 093660803X.
- Livingston, A. D. (1977). Tying Bugs and Flies for Bass. Philadelphia and New York: J. B. Lippincott Company. ISBN 0397011873., a comprehensive period guide to tying bugs and flies for bass. Very well illustrated.
- Bates, Joseph D. Jr. (1979). Streamers and bucktails, the big-fish flies. New York: Knopf. ISBN 0394415884.

==== 1980–1990s ====
- Wulff, Lee (1985). Lee Wulff on Flies. Mechanicsburg, Pennsylvania: Stackpole Books. ISBN 0811722058.
- Roberts, John (1986). New Illustrated Dictionary of Trout Flies. London, UK: George Allen and Unwin ltd. ISBN 004799035X.
- Matthews, Craig; Juracek, John (1987). Fly Patterns of Yellowstone. Self published.
- Fogg, W.S. Roger (1988). A Handbook of North Country Trout Flies. Congleton, UK: Old Vicarage Publications. ISBN 0947818111.
- LaFontaine, Gary (April 28, 1989). Caddisflies. Lyons Press. ISBN 0941130983.
- Best, A. K. (1989). Production Fly Tying. Boulder, Colorado: Pruett Publishing Company. ISBN 0871087812., one of the most comprehensive treatments of techniques for tying all types of flies for commercial quality.
- Kaufmann, Randall (1991). Tying Dry Flies-The Complete Dry Fly Instruction and Pattern Manual. Portland, Or: Western Fisherman Press. ISBN 0961705930.
- Kreh, Lefty (1992). Fly Fishing for Bonefish, Permit & Tarpon. Birmingham, Alabama: Odysseus Editions.
- Schmookler, Paul; Sils, Ingrid V. (1994). Rare and Unusual Fly Tying Materials-A Natural History Volume 1 – Birds. Mills, MA: The Complete Sportsman. ISBN 1886961018.
- Wakeford, Jacqueline (1992). Fly Tying Tools and Materials. New York: Lyons & Burford Publishers. ISBN 1558211837., Loaded with color photographs and descriptions of the natural materials such as fur, hair and feathers used in fly tying.* Stewart, Dick; Allen, Farrow (1993). Flies for Trout. New York: Lyons & Burford. ISBN 0936644141.
- Steeves, Harrison R.; Koch, Ed (1994). Terrestrials-A Modern Approach to Fishing and Tying with Synthetic and Natural Materials. Mechanicsburg, Pennsylvania: Stackpole Books. ISBN 081170629X.
- Hughes, Dave (1995). Wet Flies: Tying and Fishing Soft-Hackles, Winged and Wingless Wets, and Fuzzy Nymphs. Mechanicsburg, Pennsylvania: Stackpole Books. ISBN 0811718689., begins with comparisons between subsurface flies and the insects they resemble. Complete materials lists and step-by-step instructions for tying soft-hackled flies, wingless wets, traditional winged wets, and fuzzy nymphs are included.
- Kreh, Lefty (1993). Professionals' Favorite Flies-Volume 1-Dry Flies, Emergers, Nymphs & Terrestrials. Birmingham, Alabama: Odysseus Editions.
- Kreh, Lefty (1994). Professionals' Favorite Flies-Volume 2-Streamers, Poppers, Crustaceans and Saltwater Patterns. Birmingham, Alabama: Odysseus Editions.
- Meyer, Deke (1995). Saltwater Flies-Over 700 of the Best. Schollmeyer, Jim. Portland, OR: Frank Amato Publications. ISBN 1571990208.
- Clarke, Barry Ord (1996). The International Guide to Fly-Tying Materials. McGraw Hill. ISBN 0070119430.
- Schmookler, Paul; Sils, Ingrid V. (1997). Rare and Unusual Fly Tying Materials-A Natural History Volume 2 – Birds and Mammals. Mills, MA: The Complete Sportsman. ISBN 1886961026.
- Reynolds, Barry; Befus, Brad; Berryman, John (1997). Carp on the Fly: A Flyfishing Guide. Spring Creek Press. ISBN 1555662072.
- Hughes, Dave (1999). Trout Flies-The Tier's Reference. Mechanicsburg, PA: Stackpole Books. ISBN 978-0811716017.

=== 21st century ===
==== 2000–2009 ====
- Schollmeyer, Jim; Leeson, Ted (2000). Inshore Flies-Best Contemporary Patterns from the Atlantic and Gulf Coasts. Portland, OR: Frank Amato Publications. ISBN 157188193X.
- Jaroworski, Ed; Popovics, Bob (2001). Pop Fleyes-Bob Popovic's Approach to Saltwater Fly Design. Mechanicsburg, Pennsylvania: Stackpole Books. ISBN 0811712478.
- Rosenbauer, Tom (2001). The Orvis Fly Tying Guide. New York: The Lyons Press. ISBN 1585740330., revised 2019
- Flower, Rob (2001). Australia Trout Food, Trout Flies and How to Fish Them. South Croydon, Victoria: Australian Fishing Network. ISBN 186513015X.
- Staples, Bruce (2002). Trout Country Flies-From Greater Yellowstone Area Masters. Portland, OR: Frank Amato Publications. ISBN 1571882480.
- Steeves, Harrison R. III (2003). Tying Flies with Foam, Fur, and Feathers. Mechanicsburg, PA: Stackpole Books. ISBN 0811729095.
- Mann, Chris (2004). Hairwing & Tube Flies for Salmon & Steelhead: A Comprehensive Guide for Anglers & Flytyers. Stackpole Books. ISBN 978-0811731768.
- Cathercole, Peter (2005). Fly Tying For Beginners: How to Tie 50 Failsafe Flies. B.E.S. ISBN 0764158457.
- Schullery, Paul (2006). The Rise-Streamside Observations on Trout, Flies and Fly Fishing. Mechanicsburg, PA: Stackpole Books. ISBN 978-0811701822.
- Soucie, Gary (2006). Woolly Wisdom. Portland, Oregon: Frank Amato Publications. ISBN 1571883525., everything you wanted to know about fishing and tying Woolly Worms, Woolly Buggers and the like. The comprehensive reference on the subject.
- Schullery, Paul (2006). Cowboy Trout-Western Fly Fishing As if it Matters. Montana Historical Society. ISBN 097215227X.
- Clouser, Bob (2006). Clouser's Flies. Mechanicsburg, Pennsylvania: Stackpole Books. ISBN 0811701484., the comprehensive treatment of tying and fishing the Clouser Minnow by the inventor of the fly, Bob Clouser.
- Sawada, Ken (2006). The Tube Fly. Tokyo, Japan: Sawada, Inc. ISBN 978-4916020512.
- Mandell, Mark; Kenly, Bob (2007). Tube Flies Two: Evolution. Frank Amato Publications. ISBN 978-1571884015.
- Kaufmann, Randall; Kaufmann, Mary (2008). Fly Patterns-Tie Thousands of Flies. Moose, WY: Western Fisherman Press. ISBN 978-1885212238.
- Craven, Charlie (2008). Charlie Craven's Basic Fly Tying: Modern Techniques for Flies That Catch Fish. New Cumberland, PA: Headwater Books. ISBN 978-0979346026.
- Greenhalgh, Malcolm; Jason Smalley (2009). Fishing Flies: A World Encyclopedia of Every Type of Fly. London: HarperCollins Publishers. ISBN 978-0007288458.

==== 2010–2020 ====
- Herd, Andrew (2012). Trout Fly Patterns 1496–1916. Ellesmere, Shropshire: Medlar Press. ISBN 978-1907110139.
- Valla, Mike (2013). The Founding Flies-43 American Masters Their Patterns and Influences. Mechanicsburg, Pennsylvania: Stackpole Books. ISBN 978-0811708333.
- Chicone, Drew (2013). Feather Brain-Developing, Testing, & Improving Saltwater Fly Patterns. Mechanicsburg, Pennsylvania: Stackpole Books. ISBN 978-0811711968.
- Craven, Charlie (2013). Tying Nymphs: Essential Flies and Techniques for the Top Patterns. Stackpole Books. ISBN 978-1934753354.
- Wiese, Walter J. (2013). Yellowstone Country Flies-The Fly Patterns of Parks' Fly Shop. Walter J. Wiese.
- Leiser, Eric (2014). The Complete Book of Fly Tying. Skyhorse. ISBN 978-1626365599.
- Dawes, Mike (2015). The Flytier's Companion. Skyhorse. ISBN 978-1629144047.
- Dawes, Mike (2015). The Flytier's Manual. Skyhorse. ISBN 978-1629144054.
- Klausmeyer, David (2015). 101 Favorite Saltwater Flies-History, Tying Tips and Fishing Strategies. New York: Skyhorse Publishing. ISBN 978-1632205384.
- Crosse, Malcom; Keam, Rick, eds. (2016). Australia's Best Trout Flies-Revisited. Hobart, Tasmania: J.M.& K. Crosse. ISBN 978-0994415929.
- Valla, Mike (2016). Tying & Fishing Bucktails and Other Hair Wings. Lanham, MD: Stackpole Books. ISBN 978-0811716765.
- Craven, Charlie (2020). Tying Streamers: Essential Flies and Techniques for the Top Patterns. Stackpole Books. ISBN 978-0811739399.
- Clarke, Barry Ord (2020). The Feather Bender's Flytying Techniques: A Comprehensive Guide to Classic and Modern Trout Flies. Skyhorse. ISBN 978-1510751507.
- Chocklett, Blane (2020). Game Changer: Tying Flies that Look and Swim Like the Real Thing. Headwater Books. ISBN 978-1934753477.
- Cohen, Pat (2020). Super Bass Flies: How to Tie and Fish The Most Effective Imitations. Skyhorse. ISBN 978-1510736894.

== Fly fishing entomology and other prey studies ==
- Halford, Frederic M. (1897). Dry Fly Entomology. London: Vinton & Co. p. 315. "Halford."
- Rhead, Louis (1916). American Trout Stream Insects. New York: Frederick A. Stokes.
- Mosely, Martin E. (1921). The Dry-Fly Fisherman's Entomology (PDF). London: George Routledge and Sons Limited.
- Jennings, Preston J. (1935). A Book of Trout Flies. New York: Crown Publishers, Derrydale Press., Jennings was probably the first American Fly Fishing writer to tie the entomology of trout stream insects to the artificial flies and how to fish them in this 1935 seminal work.
- Schwiebert, Ernest G. Jr. (1955). Matching The Hatch-A Practical Guide to Imitation of Insects Found On Eastern and Western Trout Waters. Toronto, Canada: The MacMillan Company., Matching The Hatch was the first American book to cover fly imitation from a transcontinental perspective and is widely read and reprinted. According to Paul Schullery, Matching The Hatch set the standard for fly entomology and tying studies for the late 20th Century.
- Richards, Carl; Swisher, Doug (1971). Selective Trout-A Dramatically New and Scientific Approach to Trout Fishing on Eastern and Western Rivers. New York: Crown Publishers.

And probably the most far-reaching of all American fly-fishing books since World War II, Doug Swisher and Carl Richard's Selective Trout (1971) elevated our thinking not only in fly-fishing theory, but also, through its wonderful photographs of insects, in our basic understanding of what the flies really imitated.

— Paul Schullery, The Rise, 2006

- Arbona, Fred J. (1980). Mayflies, the Angler and the Trout. Tulsa, OK: Winchester Press. ISBN 0876912994.
- LaFontaine, Gary (1989). Caddisflies. New York: Lyons Press. ISBN 0941130983.
- Richards, Carl (1995). Prey: Designing and Tying New Imitations of Fresh and Saltwater Forage Foods. New York: Lyons and Burford Publishers. ISBN 1558213325.

== Fly fishing anthologies ==
- Hills, John Waller (1921). A History of Fly Fishing for Trout. London: Phillp Allan & Co.
- Van Dyke, Henry, ed. (1932). A Creelful of Fishing Stories. New York: Charles Scribner's Sons.
- Taverner, Eric; Moore, John (1935). The Anglers Weekend Book. London: Seely Service & Co. Ltd., contains a useful bibliography entitled Angling Writers & Their Works
- Walden, Howard T. I.I., ed. (1947). Angler's Choice-An Anthology of American Trout Fishing. New York: The MacMillan Company., contains 30 stories by many noted American anglers including: La Branche, Connett, Hewitt, Bergman and Jennings. Angler's Choice is considered by Arnold Gingrich as the first American fishing anthology devoted solely to trout.
- Law, Glenn (1995). A Concise History of Fly Fishing. Birmingham, Alabama: Odysseus Editions.
- Schullery, Paul (1996). American Fly Fishing-A History. Norwalk, CT: The Easton Press.
- The Theodore Gordon Flyfishers (1996). Arnold Gingrich (ed.). American Trout Fishing. New York: Alfred A. Knopf, Inc., American Trout Fishing is the trade press edition of the Gordon Garland, a compilation of stories and history about American Trout fishing and is dedicated to Theodore Gordon. Noted fly fishing authors – Lee Wulff, Roderick Haig Brown, Ernie Schwiebert, Dana Lamb, Joe Brooks and many other contributed to this work.
- Wetmore, Jeff; Jones, Allen Morris, eds. (2001). Flylines-The Best of Big Sky Journal Fishing. Bozeman, MT: Bangtail Press. ISBN 0965333655., loaded with outstanding essays, stories and poems by many of the greats in the sport to include: George Anderson, Russell Chatham, John Holt, Nick Lyons, Datus Proper and Charles Waterman.

== Fly fishing stories and memoirs ==
- Van Dyke, Henry (1899). Fisherman's Luck. New York: Charles Scribner's Sons., a man of immense social standing, the Reverend Van Dyke's Fishersman's Luck is a classic of Victorian recreational literature-John Schullery
- Sherrington, H. T. (1920). Trout Fishing Memories and Morals (PDF). Boston: Houghton Mifflin.
- Aho, Juhani (1921). Lohilastuja ja kalakaskuja (in Finnish). Finland: WSOY.
- Walden, Howard T. (1938). Upstream and Down. New York: The Derrydale Press.
- Traver, Robert (1960). Trout Madness-Being a Dissertation on the Symptoms and Pathology of This Incurable Disease by One of Its Victims. New York: St Martin's Press.
- Hoover, Herbert (1963). Fishing For Fun – And To Wash Your Soul. New York: Random House Inc.

Herbert Hoover, thirtieth President of the United States, is a modern Izaak Walton. He values fishing for the solitude it brings and it theapeutic values to modern man as respects both body and spirit. The present tract is written in the Izaak Walton tradition and perpetuates the tradition of the wily "fresh water trouts" and their ability to outwit man.

— Justice William O. Douglas of the United States Supreme Court

- Lamb, Dana Stors (1967). Not Far From The River. Barre, Massachusetts: Barre Publishers., one of Lamb's early works, stories telling in lyric style about Atlantic Salmon fishing.
- Miller, Alfred W. (1971). Fishless Days, Angling Nights-Classic Stories, Reminiscences, and Lore About Fishing and Camping by Sparse Grey Hackle. New York: Crown Publishers Inc.

Nowhere else can you get the sidelights on Gordon, LaBranche, and Hewitt that this book gives you, along with the evocative prose that lets you relive, vicariously, some of the most extraordinary fishing and fishing companions of the last five decades. Sparse Grey Hackle was Alfred Miller's pseudonym for these writings which were originally only available as a private publication of the Anglers Club of New York

— Arnold Gingrich, The Fishing in Print, 1974.

- Lamb, Dana Stors (1973). Where Pools Are Bright and Deep. Winchester Press. ISBN 0876911106., one of many books by lyric fly-fishing writer Dana Lambs. Where Pools Are Bright and Deep is another great piece of fly-fishing poetry and story telling.
- Haig-Brown, Roderick (1974). A River Never Sleeps (Revised ed.). New York: Crown Publishers Inc., a classic by Canadian author Haig-Brown first published in 1946.
- Lamb, Dana Stors (1979). Beneath The Rising Mist. Stonewall Press. ISBN 0913276278., Beneath the Rising Mist is a collection of stories and articles written by a top lyric fishing writer, Dana Lamb. Most of the stories are about Atlantic Salmon fishing.
- Waterman, Charles F. (1986). Mist on the River-Remembrances of Dan Bailey. Livingston, Montana: Yellowstone Press. ISBN 0961725303., a comprehensive look at a Fly Fishing legend: Dan Bailey and his evolution into one of the most well known fly shop owners in Montana.
- Gierach, John (1986). Trout Bum-Fly Fishing as a Way of Life. Boulder, Colo.: Pruett Publishing. ISBN 0871087154., Trout Bum is Gierach's first and best book.

Gierach is so laid back he almost vanishes from sight and maybe this is the secret of his writing. These are stories, pure and simple, most of them come from nowhere and go to nowhere and they are about the sort of things we all do, so they seep into your soul and never quite leave you, the way all good writing should. Unlike many writers, Gierach's style and storylines transfer effortlessly from one continent to another and the book has sold well all over the world

— Dr. Andrew Herd, A Fly Fishing History

- Gierach, John (1988). A View From Rat Lake. Boulder, Colo.: Pruett. ISBN 087108743X.
- Schwiebert, Ernest (1988). A River For Christmas and Other Stories. Stephen Green.
- Gierach, John (1990). Sex, Death and Fly Fishing. New York: Simon and Schuster. ISBN 0671707388., For anyone who loves fly-fishing or is looking to begin, John Gierach offers an entertaining view of the sport. Written in a series of witty essays that are inspiring, humorous, and educational, this book will transport you to real rivers and lakes in the company of one of the great writers of fly-fishing literature.
- Gierach, John (1991). Where Trout Are As Long As Your Leg. New York: Lyons and Buford. ISBN 1558210989.
- Dawson, Chris (1994). Woolly Worms and Wombats-A Sidelong Glance At Flyfishing Downunder. Boulder, Colo.: Johnson Printing Company. ISBN 1555661211.
- Ritz, Charles (May 1999). A Fly Fishers Life-The Art and Mechanics of Fly Fishing. New York: MJF Books. ISBN 1567312640., this is the 1996 reprint of Charles Ritz (Ritz Hotels) 1959 memoir of his fly-fishing experiences. A fascinating read. Acknowledged as one of the great classics on the art of fly fishing. In 1973, Arnold Gingrich in Joys of Trout calls A Fly Fishers Life one of the top thirty outstanding fishing books printed since 1496.
- Gierach, John (1999). Standing In A River Waving a Stick. Guilford, Connecticut: The Lyons Press. ISBN 1558219994.
- Schullery, Paul (1999). Royal Coachman-The Lore and Legends of Fly-Fishing. New York: Simon and Schuster. ISBN 0684842467.
- Babb, James R. (1999). Crosscurrents: A Fly Fisher's Progress. New York: The Lyons Press. ISBN 1558219463., foreword by Ted Leeson. Based on the author's columns in Gray's Sporting Journal. Begins "Oh my. Another collection of navel-gazing essays from a baby boomer who got hold of a fly rod and a word processor and thought Eureka, I've found myself. And wants to share."
- Wulff, Lee (2000). Lee Wulff-Bush Pilot Angler. Camden, Maine: Down East Books. ISBN 0892724803. Posthumously published journal of his flying and fly-fishing off the coasts of Labrador and Newfoundland in the 1940s and 1950s.
- Swegman, Ron P. (2005). Philadelphia on the Fly: Tales of an Urban Angler. Portland, Ore.: Frank Amato Publications. ISBN 1571883614., an urban angler reveals a surprising fact: good fishing – and adventure – can be found a bike ride away within the city limits of the nation's first capital. A tale told in poetic prose, this is a practical, lyrical, all-American fish story.
- Landerman, Richard (2007). The Fly Rod Chronicles-A Collection of Essays on the Quiet Sport of Fly Fishing. Gilbert, Arizona: Sortis Publishing. ISBN 978-0977202522. Author Richard Landerman takes random, everyday musings and weaves them together with humor and substance using the common thread of fly fishing.
- Coggins, David (2021). The Optimist: A Case For the Fly Fishing Life. New York: Scribner. ISBN 978-1-9821-5250-5 . Coggins' first printed collection of fly fishing essays; achieved critical and commercial success and stands as, potentially, the first notable fly fishing memoir of the 2020s.
- Coggins, David (2024). The Believer: A Year in the Fly Fishing Life. New York: Scribner. ISBN 978-1-6680-0471-5. Successor to The Optimist; blends Coggins' experience as a travel writer with his passion for fly fishing.
- Duda, Steve (2024). River Songs: Moments of Wild Wonder in Fly Fishing. Mountaineers Books. ISBN 978-1-68051-701-9.
- Gierach, John (2024). All the Time in the World. New York: Simon & Schuster. ISBN 978-1-5011-6867-3. Gierach's final work, published before his death in 2024.
- Brown, Matthew Shane (2026). Fly Fishing in the 21st Century. Las Vegas: The Upland Soul. ISBN 979-8-9994234-1-2. Brown's essays blend traditional storytelling of fly fishing adventures, predominately in the Great Basin, with ruminations on the state of the American West.

== Fly fishing poetry ==
- Hoadley, James H. (1920). Speckled Trout-Fishing Lines and Other Verses. New York: Theo T. Schulte.
- Piper, Harry (2009). Ballad of a Bighorn Guide-Poems with Fins. Eugene, Ore.: Xlibris. ISBN 978-1441538567.

== Fly fishing humor ==
- Ford, Corey (1958). You Can Always Tell A Fisherman-But You Can't Tell Him Much. New York: Henry Holt and Company., a compilation of short stories first published by Corey Ford in Field and Stream. Jokingly labeled: The Minutes of the Lower Forty Shooting, Angling and Inside Straight Club.
- Hartley, J. R. (1991). Fly fishing : memories of angling days. New York, NY: HarperCollins. ISBN 0-06-018232-6. OCLC 26805363.
- Hartley, J. R.; Russell, Michael (1992). J.R.Hartley Casts Again: More Memories of Angling Days. London: Stanley Paul & Co. ISBN 0091774373.

== Fly fishing art and artists ==
- Schaldach, William J. (1937). Fish By Schaldach-Collected Etchings, Drawings and Water Colors of Trout, Salmon and Other Game Fish. Philadelphia: J. B. Lippincott and Company., Schaldach was an artist-angler. This work contains 60 reproductions of his art. Many of his illustrations adorned other Fly Fishing literature, to include fly fishing articles in Esquire magazine.
- Read, Stanley E. (1977). Tommy Brayshaw-The Ardent Angler-Artist. Vancouver, BC: University of British Columbia Press. ISBN 0774800895., Brayshaw was a conservation minded angler in British Columbia who is best known for his illustration of Roderick Haig Brown books. Contains twenty-two color plates and 28 inked drawings

== Fly fishing fiction ==
- Slosson, Annie Trumbull (1889). Fishin' Jimmy. New York: Anson D. F. Randolph Co., Annie Trumbull Slosson (1838–1926) was an important short story writer who epitomized the American local color movement that flourished after the Civil War and ended at the beginning of the twentieth century.

The loveliest of all her simple narratives is that which I have chosen to stand near the end of this book, – a kind of benediction on anglers.

— Henry Van Dyke, A Creelful of Fishing Stories, 1932

- MacDougall, Arthur R. (1946). Under A Willow Tree. New York: Coward-McCann, Inc., Dud Dean stories about angling, hunting and camping in the wilds of Maine.
- Detweiler, M. David (2001). The Guide and The CEO. Mechanicsburg, Pennsylvania: Stackpole Books. ISBN 0811707059., The Guide and the CEO us a superbly told story about the relationship that develops between a trout bum-guide and a hard-as-nails Wall Street mogul.

== Geographic, regional and specific waters fly fishing guides ==
- Newland, Rev. Henry (1851). The Erne, It Legends and Its Fly-fishing (PDF). London: Chapman and Hall.
- Back, Howard (1938). The Waters of the Yellowstone with Rod and Fly. New York: Dodd & Mead., memoirs of Howard Back's two visits to Yellowstone National Park in 1936 and 1937. Wonderful insights into what fly fishing the park was like in the 1930s. Reprinted in 2000.
- McDermand, Charles (1946). Waters of The Golden Trout County. New York: G. P. Putnam and Sons., a very descriptive work of the Golden Trout waters of the southern Sierra Nevada Mountains in California.
- MacDowell, Sly (1948). Western Trout. New York: Alfred A. Knopf, Inc.
- Bradner, Enos (1969). Northwest Angling. Portland, Ore.: Binfords & Mort Publishers., interesting chapters on fly tying for Northwest trout, fly-fishing for Steelhead, Salmon, Sea-run Cutthroat trout and Shad.
- Brooks, Charles E. (1979). The Living River-A Fisherman's Intimate Profile of the Madison River Watershed – Its History, Ecology, Lore and Angling Opportunities. New York: Nick Lyons Books. ISBN 0385156553.
- Brooks, Charles E. (1984). Fishing Yellowstone Waters. Clinton, N.J.: New Win Publishing Inc. ISBN 0832903531., this is an excellent source of information for fly fishing in Yellowstone National Park. An extensive amount of information, combined with detailed hatch information, makes this a great guidebook to have for anyone planning on fly fishing in Yellowstone National Park.
- Brooks, Charles E. (1986). The Henry's Fork. Piscataway, N.J.: Winchester Press. ISBN 0832904252.
- Repine, Jim; Wulff, Lee (1988). How to Fly Fish Alaska. Portland, Ore.: Frank Amato. ISBN 0936608684.
- Hughes, Dave (1992). The Yellowstone River and its Angling. Portland, Ore.: Frank Amato Publications. ISBN 1878175238.
- Probasco, Steve (1994). River Journal: Yakima River: Volume 6. Portland, Ore.: Frank Amato. ISBN 1878175750.
- Walinchus, Rod; Travis, Tom (1995). Fly Fishing The Yellowstone River. Boulder, Colo.: Pruett Publishing. ISBN 0871088614., probably the most comprehensive work every published on fishing the Yellowstone River from the park waters all the way to Big Timber.
- Probasco, Steve (1995). River Journal: Big Hole. Portland, Ore.: Frank Amato Publishers. ISBN 1571880062.
- Holt, John (1996). Montana Fly-Fishing Guide-East. Guilford, Connecticut: The Lyons Press. ISBN 1585745294., comprehensive, stream by stream guide to fly fishing in Eastern Montana. Contains extensive descriptions of tributaries and secondary waters.
- Mathews, Craig; Molinero, Clayton (1997). The Yellowstone Fly-Fishing Guide-A authoritative guide to the waters of Yellowstone National Park. Guilford, Connecticut: The Lyons Press. ISBN 155821545X.
- Sajna, Mike (1999). Days on the Water-The Angling Tradition in Pennsylvania. Pittsburgh: University of Pittsburgh Press. ISBN 0822940396., from a wade through the chilly waters of early April to his last muddy trek in late October, Mike Sajna remembers the days in one season of America's oldest sport – fly fishing. His territory: the streams, dams and runs of the three major river systems in Pennsylvania – the Ohio, the Susquehanna, and the Delaware.

... journalist Sadja provides an engaging history of sport fishing in Pennsylvania.

— Explore Pennsylvania History

- Edrington, Bill (2003). Fly Fishing the Arkansas: An Angler's Guide and Journal. Xlibris Corporation. ISBN 141343522X., a very nicely written, comprehensive but concise guide to fly-fishing the upper Arkansas River from Leadville to Royal Gorge Colorado.
- Staples, Bruce; Jacklin, Bob (2021). Fly Fishing West Yellowstone-A History and Guide. Guilford, CT: Stackpole Books. ISBN 978-0811738255.

== Fly rods and fly casting ==
- Bowlker, Charles (1854). Art of Angling-Containing Directions for Fly-Fishing, Trolling, Making Artificial Flies, etc. London: R. Jones.
- Wells, Henry P. (1885). Fly Rods and Fly Tackle (PDF). New York: Harper & Brothers.
- Holden, George Parker (1920). The Idyl of Split-Bamboo – A Carefully Detailed Description of the Rod's Building. Cincinnati, OH: Stewart and Kidd Company Publishers.
- Robinson, Gilmer G. (1942). Fly Casting. New York: A. S. Barnes & Co.
- Smedley, Harold H. "Dike" (1949). Accuracy Fly Casting. Chicago-New York: Ziff-Davis Publishing., illustrated fly casting guide by Winner of National, Great Lakes, Midwest, Michigan and New York Fly Casting Championships.
- Garrison, Everett; Carmichael, Hoagy (1977). A master's Guide to Building a bamboo fly rod. New York: Martha's Glen Publishers. ISBN 0811703525.
- Wulff, Joan (1987). Joan Wulff's Fly-Casting Techniques. New York: Nick Lyons Books. ISBN 094113038X.
- Gierach, John (1997). Fishing Bamboo-One Man's Love Affair with Bamboo Fly Rods. New York: The Lyons Press. ISBN 1558215913., Noted angling author John Gierach's musings about Bamboo fly rods – why he fishes and collects them.
