= Bibliography of fly fishing (species related) =

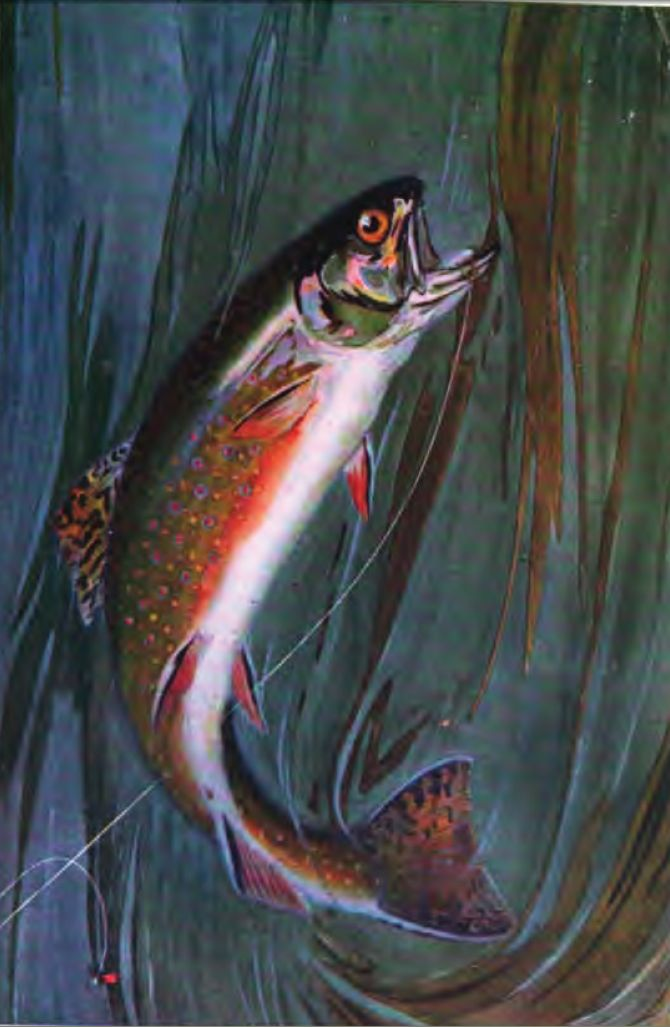
Speckled Brook Trout – Louis Rhead, 1902

This annotated bibliography is intended to list both notable and not so notable works of English language, non-fiction and fiction related to the sport of fly fishing listed by year published. Although 100% of any book listed is not necessarily devoted to fly fishing, all these titles have significant fly fishing content. Included in this bibliography is a list of species related fly fishing literature.

- For readability, the bibliography is contained in three separate lists. For classic general texts, history of fly fishing and fly fishing library collections see: Bibliography of fly fishing
- For fly tying, fly tackle, regional guides, memoirs, stories and fly fishing fiction see: Bibliography of fly fishing (fly tying, stories, fiction)

== Annotations ==
Annotations may reflect descriptive comments from the book's dust jacket, third party reviews or personal, descriptive and qualitative comments by individuals who have read the book. Some older works have links to online versions in the Internet Archive or Google Books.

== Fly fishing for trout ==
=== 19th century ===
- Pulman, George Philip Rigney (1851). The Vade Mecum of Fly Fishing for Trout; being a complete treatise on that part of the art of angling (PDF). London: Longman, Brown, Green & Longmans.

Many books on the history of fly fishing for trout credit George Pulman for being the first writer to suggest fishing trout flies as dry flies. Pulman builds up to the introduction of the dry fly by writing very vell about the principle of trout-fly imitation, including size, color and form

— Sylvester Nemes, 2004

- Drake, Grey (1860). A Concise Practical Treatise on Artificial Fly Fishing For Trout (PDF). London: G. Berger.
- Halford, F. M. (1888). Dry Fly Fishing – In Theory and Practice. London: Ballantine Press. "Halford."
- Cutcliffe, H. C. (1889). The Art of Trout Fishing on Rapid Streams (PDF). London: Sampson, Low, Marston, Searle & Rivington.

==== (1900–1930s) ====
- Rhead, Louis (1902). The Speckled Brook Trout. New York: R. H. Russell.
- Riddell, J. A. (1909). All About Trout Fishing (PDF). London: The Walter Scott Publishing Co.
- Skues, G. E. M. (1910). Minor Tactics of the Chalk Stream (PDF). London: A & C Black.

One of the subtlest writers on fishing with fly in any form is G.E.M. Skues, the author of Nymph Fishing. His book Minor Tactics of the Chalk Stream, put an end to the dry-fly purist and brought the angling world back to sanity.

— James Robb, Notable Angling Literature (1945)

- Gill, Emlyn M. (1912). Practical Dry Fly Fishing (PDF). New York: Charles Scribner's Sons.
- Camp, Samuel G. (1913). Fishing with Floating Flies (PDF). New York: Outing Publishing Company.
- La Branche, George M. L. (1914). The Dry Fly and Fast Water. New York: Charles Scribner's Sons. The Dry Fly and Fast Water is one of the classic works on American fly fishing. In it La Branche, a contemporary of Theodore Gordon, helped established a unique early 20th-century American approach to dry fly fishing distinctly evolved from the long-standing theories of the British angler Halford.
- Southard, Charles Zibeon (1914). Trout Fly-fishing in America (PDF). New York: E. P. Dutton & Co.
- Bradford, Charles (1916). The Determined Angler and the Brook Trout (PDF). New York: G. P. Putnam & Sons.
- Skues, G. E. M. (1921). The Way of a Trout with the Fly: And some further studies in minor tactics (PDF). London: Adams and Charles Black. Skues was the greatest early twentieth-century authority on nymph fishing for trout.

This is a classic and I often wonder if Skues knew it would be when he set pen to paper. The book is inspirational in a way that Halford's work never was and grips the reader's attention right from the cover, which in the first edition bears the words: .... The Way of a Trout shows Skues at the height of his powers and it contains the best of his thinking on fishing nymphs and semi-submerged patterns, illustrated by the sort of asides, stories and vast fund of experience that only he could call upon.

— Dr. Andrew Herd

- Rhead, Louis (1921). How To Fish The Dry Fly (PDF). Brooklyn: Louis Rhead.
- Bridgett, Robert C. (1922). Dry Fly Fishing (PDF). London: Robert Jenkins Limited.
- Dunne, J. W. (1924). Sunshine and the Dry Fly. London: Adam & Charles Black, Ltd.
- Southard, Charles Zibeon (1928). The Evolution of Trout and Trout Fishing in America. New York: E.P. Dutton and Company.
- Southard, Charles Zibeon (1931). A Treatise on Trout for the Progressive Angler. New York: E.P. Dutton and Company.
- Harding, Col E. W. (1931). The Flyfisher & the Trout's Point of View: New Light on Flyfishing Theory & Practice. London: Seeley Service & Company, Ltd.
- Skues, G. E. M. (1939). Nymph Fishing for Caulk Stream Trout. London: A & C Black.

==== (1940–1970s) ====
- Connett, Eugene V. III (1940). Any Luck? – Trout Fishing. New York: Garden City Publishing Inc.
- Marinaro, Vincent C. (1950). A Modern Dry Fly Code. New York: G. P. Putnam Sons. ISBN 1-55821-413-5. One of the most important angling books of the 20th century A Modern Dry Fly Code, Marinaro revolutionized American trout fishing with his experiences on the Pennsylvania spring creeks in the 1940s and 50s.

A Modern Dry Fly Code was first published in 1950 and it remains a popular work, having been reprinted at least twice. The Code attracted attention right from the start because there was more in it about terrestrials than there was about mayflies and also because the author focused attention on small imitations to an extent that had never been encouraged before. Marinaro was a brave man for doing it and for some time he stood out as a lone voice in the wilderness; he was challenged, for example, for suggesting that size 14 was the largest hook needed for a dry fly imitation (this was in the days before hooks were available in sizes below 20s). In retrospect, Marinaro probably kicked off a fashion for tiny patterns that went just a little too far before it corrected itself, but his basic point was well made.

— Dr. Andrew Herd

- Skues, G. E. M. (1950). Silk, Fur and Feather, The Trout-Fly Dressers Year. London: Fishing Gazette.
- Skues, G. E. M. (1951). Itchen Memories. London: Herbert Jenkins.
- Bergman, Ray (1952). Trout. New York: Alfred A. Knopf. Ray Bergman, one of the great angling writers of the 20th century – The Dr. Spock of American fly fishing in the mid-20th century – was a former editor of Outdoor Life magazine.

Bergman's Trout is the largest (451 pages) ever devoted to one fish in American publishing history. Many anglers, obviously feeling that there's nothing you can learn from a book that you can't learn better from a fish, consider their libraries complete once they've bought their copies of Bergman's Trout.

— Arnold Gingrich, Joys of Trout, 1973

- Everett, Fred (1952). Fun With Trout. Harrisburg, Pennsylvania: The Telegraph Press.
- Walker, C. F. (1956). Angling Letters of G.E.M. Skues. London: Adam and Charles Black.
- Quick, Jim (1957). Trout Fishing and Trout Flies. South Brunswick, N.J.: A. S. Barnes. An easy reading, contemporary (post WW II) review of the various species of trout, how to fish for them and the various types of flies to use. Contains a dictionary of 'Productive Patterns' with pattern recipes and nice color plates.
- Hidy, Vernon S. (1960). Sports Illustrated Book of Wet-Fly Fishing. Time Inc.
- Quick, James (1960). Fishing The Nymph. New York: Ronald Press.
- Fox, Charles K. (1963). This Wonderful World of Trout. Carlisle, Pennsylvania: Foxcrest. Fox, who Arnold Gingrich calls the Chaucer of the Le Tort, was one of the Pennsylvania spring creek anglers who pioneered terrestrial fishing with small flies on spring creeks. Gingrich believed This Wonderful World of Trout deserved a permanent place in every fly fishers library.
- Flick, Arthur B. (1967). The New Streamside Guide to Naturals and their Imitations. New York: Crown Publishers Inc. Describes the flies and nymphs significant in trout fishing, and explains the procedures for constructing imitations
- Brooks, Charles E. (1970). Larger Trout for the Western Fly Fisherman. New York: A. S. Barnes and Co. ISBN 0-498-07334-3.
- Brooks, Joe (1972). Trout Fishing. New York: Harper & Row. Considered the most popular, all-around fly fishing book in the late 20th century by Paul Schullery in American Fly Fishing – A History
- Wright, Leonard M. Jr. (1972). Fishing the Dry Fly As A Living Insect – An Unorthodox Method. New York: E. P. Dutton & Co., Inc. ISBN 0-525-21740-1.

Mr. Wright's first book, Fishing the Dry Fly as a Living Insect (E. P. Dutton, 1972) raised the hackles of some reviewers and weekend fishermen. The sportswriter Red Smith wondered in The New York Times whether its author could possibly still be alive. Surely, Mr. Smith wrote, he must have been struck dead for blasphemy, for he had the audacity to suggest that the high priest, Frederic Halford, and such sainted subdeacons as Theodore Gordon, George M. L. LaBranche and Edward Ringwood Hewitt had rocks in their heads when it came to floating a tuft of feather and silk over a trout. The Halford gospel, Mr. Smith noted, taught that the fly should be cast upstream and floated down in an absolutely dead drift. Mr. Wright cast down and across and twitched the fly as he did to suggest to the fish that "here is something alive, edible and defenseless." But Mr. Smith tried the Wright method and then accepted, as he wrote, "what Mr. Wright tells us now – that nothing brings out the essential bully in a trout like a live bug he knows he can whip."

— From Leonard Wright's obituary in The New York Times, 2001

- Heacox, Cecil E. (1974). The Complete Brown Trout. New York: Winchester Press. ISBN 0-87691-129-7. the first comprehensive, in-depth study of the Brown Trout, Salmo Trutta: its origin, distribution, anatomy, life history, diet; the methods used to manage and propagate it; and the tactics and tackle that have been developed to fish for it.
- Brooks, Charles E. (1974). The Trout and The Stream. New York: Crown Publishers. focused on Western Trout fishing, The Trout and The Stream help popularize large and heavy stonefly nymph fishing in the West
- Fox, Charles K. (1976). Rising Trout. New York: Hawthorn Books. ISBN 0-8015-6394-1. A compilation of the observations, discoveries, and informed opinions of a man who knows trout. Discusses the literature, ecology and techniques of trout fishing. The author refers mainly to New England limestone rivers, and the LeTort in particular.
- Brooks, Charles E. (1976). Nymph Fishing For Larger Trout. New York: Crown Publishers. ISBN 0-517-52551-8.

Brook's book is often seen as the best companion for Schweibert's [Nymphs]; the latter is lacking in detailed instructions on fishing techniques, and the former [this book] contains a catalog of historically known and modern ways of fishing the imitations

— Paul Schullery, American Fly Fishing – A History, 1996.

- Ovington, Ray (1977). The Trout and The Fly. New York: Hawthorn Books Inc. ISBN 0-8015-7982-1. This is Ovington's seventh book on trout and fly fishing. He concentrates on the development of both the skills and the instinctive know-how necessary to fully appreciate the fine art of taking trout on flies.

==== (1980s–1990s) ====
- Lee, Art (1982). Fishing Dry Flies for Trout on Rivers and Streams. New York: Atheneum Publishers Inc. ISBN 0-689-10959-8. Contains four Color Plates of dry flies
- Wulff, Lee (1986). Trout on a Fly. New York: The Lyons Press. ISBN 1-55821-076-8.
- Gierach, John (1989). Fly Fishing Small Streams. Harrisburg, PA: Stackpole Books. ISBN 0-8117-2290-2. Tips and techniques written in John Gierach's passionate and notable style.
- Engle, Ed (1991). Fly Fishing The Tailwaters. Mechanicsburg, Pennsylvania: Stackpole Books. ISBN 0-8117-2343-7.
- Meck, Charles R. (1991). Fishing Small Stream with a Fly Rod. Woodstock, Vermont: The Countryman Press. ISBN 0-88150-201-4.
- Ritchie, Tony (1994). Dry Fly-Fishing for Trout. Kenhurst, NSW, Australia: Kangaroo Press. ISBN 0-86417-622-8.
- Ritchie, Tony (1994). Finding Feeding Trout. NSW, Australia: Kangaroo Press. ISBN 0864176325.

==== 21st century ====
.

- Hughes, Dave (2002). Taking Trout – Good, Solid, Practical Advice for Fly Fishing Streams and Stillwaters. Mechanicsburg, Pennsylvania: Stackpole Books. ISBN 0-8117-2906-0.
- Johnson, Les (2004). Fly-Fishing Coastal Cutthroat Trout: Flies, Techniques, Conservation. Portland, OR: Frank Amato Publishers. ISBN 978-1-57188-334-6.
- Kustich, Jerry (2005). A Wisp In The Wind – In Search of Bull Trout, Bamboo, and Beyond. Grand Island, NY: West River Publishing. ISBN 0-9633109-4-1. This book provides a well written, insiders look into the techniques, equipment and personalities employed in manufacture of R. L. Winston Bamboo Fly Rods by Jerry and the crew at the Twin Bridges, Montana, factory. His stories do a nice job of revealing the whole karma around fishing for trout with Bamboo. Jerry also provides some interesting cultural and environmental insights about the rivers in Twin Bridges and Western Montana in general.
- Engle, Ed (2005). Fishing Small Flies. Mechanicsburg, Pennsylvania: Stackpole Books. ISBN 0-8117-0124-7.
- Schullery, Paul (2006). The Rise – Streamside Observations on Trout, Flies and Fly Fishing. Mechanicsburg, Pennsylvania: Stackpole Books. ISBN 978-0-8117-0182-2.
- Werrett, Michelle (2023). Song of the Streams. Fishing and conservation on Exmoor. Exmoor rivers and streams appear little changed since Claude Wade described them in his 1903 book of fishing memories, yet the numbers he and other long-ago writers reported catching are unbelievable today. Those streams must once have held an astonishing abundance of fish. The author sets out to fish where Wade fished, to cast the same flies on the same pools, to explore how fishing the streams of Exmoor might compare with fishing them over a century ago, whether those streams have changed and how they might be faring today. Medlar Press. ISBN 978-1-915694-07-2

== Fly fishing for salmon, steelhead, and seatrout ==
- Scrope, William (1843). Days and Nights of Salmon Fishing in the Tweed; with a short Account (PDF). London: John Murray. Entertaining anecdotes abound, and useful information relating to making flies and the fine art of salmon fishing is masterfully recounted.
- Alexander, Sir Hames Edwards, Colonel (1860). Salmon Fishing in Canada (PDF). London: Longman, Green, Longman & Roberts.
- Younger, John (1864). River Angling for Salmon and Trout (PDF). Edinburgh, Scotland: William Blackwood & Sons.
- Peard, W. MD (1867). A Year of Liberty; or Salmon Angling in Ireland (PDF). London: Horace Cox.
- Hallock, Charles (1890). The Salmon Fisher. New York: The Harris Publishing Co.
- Hamilton, Edward MD (1895). Recollections of Fly-Fishing Salmon, Trout, & Grayling. New York: Orange Judd Company.
- Sage, Dean; Townsend, C. H.; Harris, William C.; Smith, H. M. (1904). Salmon and Trout (PDF). New York: MacMillan Company.
- Hardy, John James (1907). Salmon Fishing (PDF). London: Country Life.
- Claytor, A. H. (1910). Letters to a Salmon Fisher's Son (PDF). Boston: Houghton Mifflin.
- Hodgson, William Earl (1920). Salmon Fishing (PDF). London: A. C. Black Ltd.
- Hewitt, Edward Ringwood (1922). Secrets of the Salmon (PDF). New York: Charles Scribner's Sons.
- Griswold, F. Gray (1926). Fish Facts and Fancies. New York: Charles Scribner's Sons.
- Wulff, Lee (1958). The Atlantic Salmon. New York: A.S. Barnes and Company.
- Bates, Joseph D. (1970). Atlantic Salmon Flies and Fishing. Harrisburg, Pennsylvania: Stackpole Books. ISBN 0-8117-0180-8., A comprehensive look at all aspects of Atlantic Salmon fishing and dressing Atlantic Salmon flies. Eight color plates of Flies.
- Bates, Joseph D. Jr., ed. (1975). The Atlantic salmon treasury:an anthology of selections from the first quarter-century of the Atlantic salmon journal. Montreal: Atlantic Salmon Association.
- Streamers and bucktails, the big-fish flies. New York: Knopf. 1979. ISBN 0-394-41588-4.
- Combs, Trey (1976). Steelhead Fly Fishing and Flies. Portland, Oregon: Frank Amato. ISBN 0-936608-03-X. Steelhead Fly Fishing and Flies recounts the early history of Steelhead fishing and the variety of flies used. Full of color plates and B&W photos of many of the early Steelhead fly tyers such as Roderick Haig-Brown and Enos Bradner.
- Combs, Trey (1991). Steelhead Fly Fishing. New York: Lyons and Burford Publishers. ISBN 1-55821-119-5.
- Wulff, Lee (1992). Merwin, John (ed.). Salmon on a Fly: the Essential Wisdom and Lore from a Lifetime of Salmon Fishing. Riverside, New Jersey: Simon & Schuster. ISBN 0-671-76065-3.
- Bates, Joseph D. Jr. (1996). Fishing Atlantic Salmon. Harrisburg, Pennsylvania: Stackpole Books. ISBN 0-8117-0636-2.

== Fly fishing for bass ==
- Henshall, James A. MD (1881). Book of the Black Bass-Angling and Fly Fishing. Cincinnati: Robert Clark & Co. The seminal work describing the Black Basses (Sunfish) of N. America as well as all the various techniques used to catch them.
- Bradford, Charles Barker (1888). Black Bass – Where to catch them in quantity within an hour's ride of New York (PDF). New York: W. P. Pond.
- Henshall, James A. MD (1889). More About the Black Bass (PDF). Cincinnati: Robert Clark & Co.
- Jones, Sheridan R. (1924). Black Bass & Bass-Craft: The Life and Habits of the Two Bass and Successful Angling Strategy. New York: MacMillan. This is one of those dated, but well-written books on bass fishing that every serious recreational bass angler ought to read. This well illustrated (photos) book provides useful information on fishing for both large and smallmouth bass, especially in rivers and streams.
- Ripley, Ozark (1924). Bass and Bass Fishing. Cincinnati: Sportsman Digest Publishing Co.
- Bergman, Ray (1942). Fresh-water Bass. New York: William Penn Publishing Co.
- Brooks, Joe (1947). Bass Bug Fishing. South Brunswick, NJ: A. S. Barnes.
- Knight, John Alden (1949). Black Bass. New York: G. P. Putnam and Sons. Contains beautiful color plates of bass poppers and flies as well as interesting bass fishing photos.
- Kesting, Ted (1962). Bass Fishing – Sports Afield Library. New York: Thomas Nelson & Sons.
- Ovington, Ray (1983). Tactics on Bass – How to Wade, Cast, and Fish Out Each of 23 Different Kinds of Bass Areas. New York: Charles Scribner's Sons. ISBN 0-684-17860-5. This book focuses on mainly fly fishing techniques for bass encountered in all types of waters.
- Murray, Harry (1989). Fly Fishing For Smallmouth Bass. New York: Lyons and Burford Publishers. ISBN 0-941130-85-1.

He [Harry] doesn't have much modern competition in this area [Bass fishing in rivers]. If you want more detail you'll have to wait for new techniques to be developed

— Charles Waterman, 1989.

- Waterman, Charles F. (1993). Black Bass and the Fly Rod. Mechanicsburg, Pennsylvania: Stackpole Books. ISBN 0-8117-1630-9.

== Fly fishing for panfish ==
- Rice, F. Philip (1984). Panfishing. New York: Stackpole Books. ISBN 0-943822-25-4.
- Malo, John (1981). Fly-Fishing for Panfish. Minneapolis, Minnesota: Dillon Press Inc. ISBN 0-87518-208-9.
- Rice, F. Philip (1964). America's Favorite Fishing – A Complete Guide to Angling for Panfish. New York: Harper Row.
- Ellis, Jack (1993). The Sunfishes – A Fly Fishing Journey of Discovery. Bennington, Vermont: Abenaki Publishers, Inc. ISBN 0-936644-17-6. In The Sunfishes Jack Ellis transcends the cavalier attitude with which many anglers approach sunfish. This is not a book about tossing a yellow popping bug or gaudy wet fly into a school of hungry, gullible bluegills in a suburban pond. The Sunfishes is written with the same thoughtfulness, zeal, and respect as are most trout-fishing books.
- Swegman, Ron P. (2009). Small Fry: The Lure of the Little. Cincinnati, Ohio: The Whitefish Press. ISBN 978-0-9842677-0-5. Small Fry: The Lure of the Little is a literary study of small fish and small waters, a survey of fly fishing literature, and a personal memoir contrasting youthful fishing stories with contemporary angling adventures. The author's search for small fry on the fly takes him to places as remote as the small streams in the Appalachian Mountains and as urban as the ponds in Manhattan's Central Park. Laced with the humor and the poetry of experience, Small Fry reveals why "the lure of the little" is a passion worth catching.

== Fly fishing for rough and other species ==
- Gooch, Bob (1970). The Weedy World of Pickerels. New Jersey: A. S. Barnes and Co. ISBN 978-0-498-07454-7.
- Pfeiffer, C. Boyd (1975). Shad Fishing. New York: Crown Publishers, Inc. ISBN 0-517-51900-3. Everything you ever want to know about Shad and shad fishing techniques. Contains several chapters on fly fishing for shad and the flies to use.
- Reynolds, Barry; Berryman, John (1993). Pike on the Fly – The Fly Fishing Guide To Northerns, Tigers, and Muskies. Boulder, Colorado: Johnson Printing Company. ISBN 1-55566-113-0. This book takes a seasonal approach to address everything you need to know to catch northerns, tigers and muskies on a fly.

== Stillwater fly fishing ==
- Ivens, T C (1952). Stillwater Fly-Fishing: A Modern Guide to Angling in Reservoirs and Lakes. London: Derek Verschoyle. One of the two or three really important books on stillwater fly fishing in Britain. It gave a rationale to the earlier reservoir angler, and is still one of the most useful books on the subject. Full of sensible and practical ideas and advice.
- Goddard, John (1969). Trout Flies of Stillwater. London: Adams and Charles Black. The Natural Fly, its Matching Artificial and Fishing Technique. A book which deals with the more common flies found in stillwater, on many English lakes, lochs and reservoirs, and provides extensive information on fishing methods, and the various techniques required to fish the many hundreds of artificial patterns listed.
- Cordes, Ron; Kaufmann, Randall (1984). Lake Fishing With A Fly. Portland, Oregon: Frank Amato Publications. ISBN 0-936608-26-9. a comprehensive guide to fly fishing on lakes, particularly for trout. With color plates and an extensive bibliography. One of the most important American books on the subject of stillwater fly fishing
- Headley, Stan (2005). The Loch Fisher's Bible. London: Robert Hale. ISBN 0-7090-7125-6.

== Saltwater fly fishing ==
- Sand, George X. (1969). Saltwater Fly Fishing. New York: Alfred A. Knopf. Sand's Saltwater Fly Fishing is the first really comprehensive treatment of the application of fly-fishing techniques to saltwater species in both cold and warm waters.
- Kreh, Lefty (1974). Fly Fishing in Saltwater. New York: Crown Publishers Inc.

Lefty codified the saltwater fly-fishing experience in 1974 with the publication of Fly Fishing in Saltwater. This [book] became a virtual bible for an emerging generation of saltwater anglers. It was – and remains – indispenable reading

— Glenn Law, Concise History of Fly Fishing, 1995.

- Mitchell, Ed (1995). Fly Rodding The Coast. Mechanicsburg, Pennsylvania: Stackpole Books. ISBN 0-8117-0628-1. this illustrated guide to saltwater fly fishing includes everything the angler need to know to be successful in the salt. Includes where to find the best places to fish in New England.
- Swisher, Doug; Richards, Carl (1995). Backcountry Fly Fishing in Saltwater. New York: Lyons & Burford Publishers. ISBN 1-55821-328-7.
- Beck, Cathy; Beck, Barry (1999). Fly Fishing The Flats. Mechanicsburg, Pennsylvania: Stackpole Books. ISBN 0-8117-2764-5.
- Zeigler, Norm (2007). Snook on a Fly: Tackle, Tactics, and Tips for Catching the Great Saltwater Gamefish. Mechanicsburg, Pennsylvania: Stackpole Books. ISBN 978-0-8117-0201-0.
