= Drew Chicone =

American author and fly fisherman

Andrew "Drew" Chicone
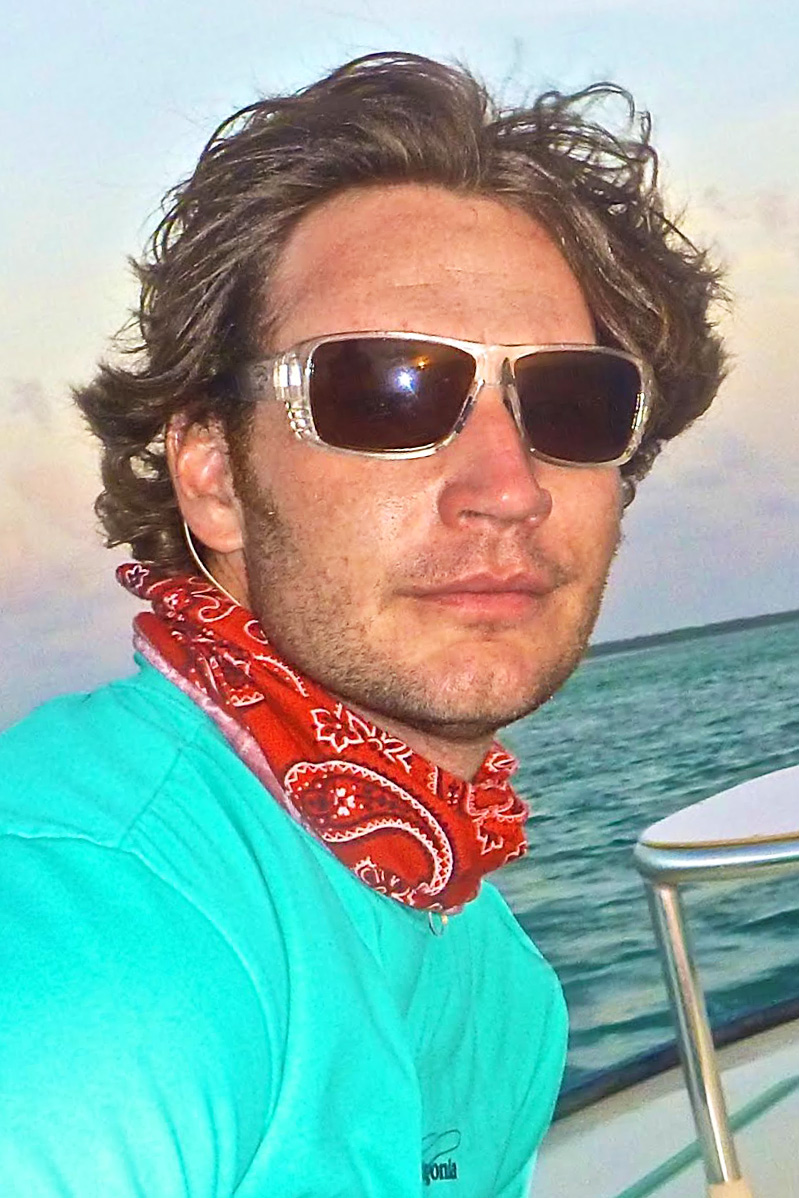
- Born: Andrew D. Chicone; 1979 (age 46–47); Elmira, New York
- Occupations: Saltwater fly designer, fly fisherman and author

Andrew "Drew" Chicone (born 1979) is an American author, saltwater fly designer, fly fisherman and fly casting instructor. He writes books and magazine articles demonstrating how to tie saltwater fly patterns, primarily focused on warm-water fish and fly fishing from standup paddleboards.

== Biography ==
=== Early life ===
Chicone grew up in upstate New York, where he learned how to tie flies at the age of six from his parents.; the first fish he caught with a fly he tied was a Landlocked Salmon. He graduated with a Bachelor of Science degree in business from Hartrwick College in 2001.

=== Writing career ===
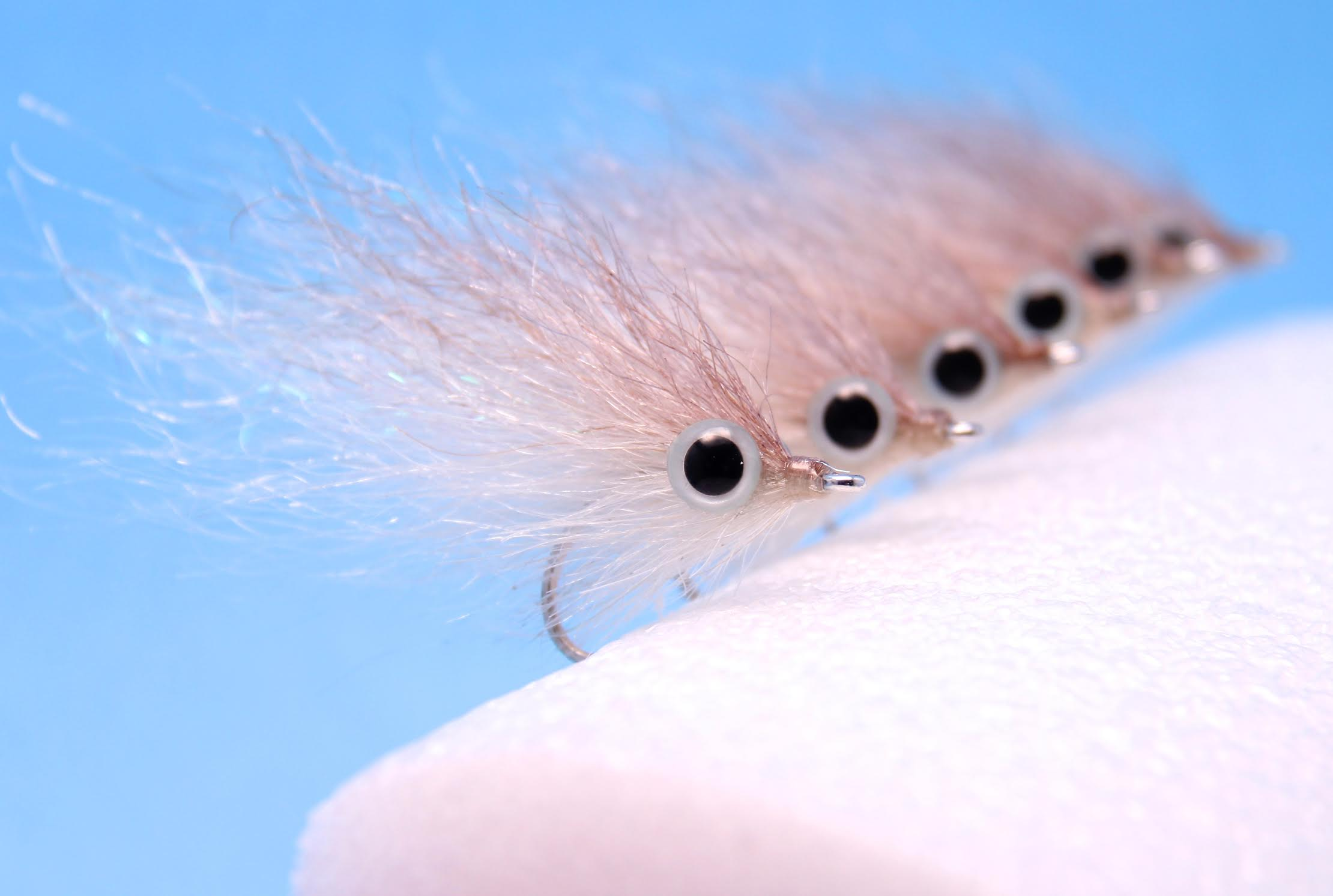
Sanibel Cannibal saltwater fly pattern from Feather Brain

Chicone started his fly tying business in 2008, followed by publishing a monthly email newsletter in 2012 with the desire to "spread the word about new or unique materials, techniques and patterns."

He is a contributing writer for Patagonia, and is a member of the Outdoor Writers Association of America. A number of his articles with his patterns and fly tying instructions have appeared in fishing and fly tying magazines including USA Today Hunt & Fish, Fly Tyer, Fly Life Magazine and Salt Water Sportsman as well as smaller fly fishing and fly tying magazines. He has appeared on ESPN 99.3 Reel Talk Radio and was profiled in Fly Tyer Magazine, which called him ed the "reigning king of fly tying methodology" .

In 2013, Stackpole Books published his first book, Feather Brain: Developing, Testing, and Improving Saltwater Fly Patterns, which provides step-by-step instructions and photos for tying 14 flies that he designed. The book received endorsements from industry peers Jonny King and the late Eric Leiser.

Chicone's largest book, Top Saltwater Flies (Wild River Press), consists of a species-specific book for each of bonefish, permit and tarpon. The work is nearly 900 pages, reportedly the largest book written on the topic of fly tying.

Most of his later books are self-published species-specific guides with instructions and photographs for tying fly designs created by Chicone and other designers or professional fly fishermen, sometimes combined with interviews with the original creator.

=== Fly tying ===
Chicone's theory for creating effective fly designs revolves around his study of baitfish habits and movements through the water, that he attempts to replicate in his designs. Some peers regard his approach to fly design and tying methods as unique. Some of his designs have been regarded as effective by peers, won industry awards and included in books by other authors.

Chicone is or has been on many pro teams including Dyna-King, Nautilus, Hardy, Whiting Farms, Daiichi, Mustad, and Loon. He's sponsored by Patagonia, CTS Fishing, Dyna-King, and Airflo.

=== Other professional endeavors ===
Chicone is an ambassador for the American Museum of Fly Fishing, a member of the Tarpon and Bonefish Trust, and plays an active role in the preservation of local fisheries.

He has also invented materials and tools for fly tying which are sold by Hareline Dubbin. Some of Chicone's fly patterns which have been commercially tied and sold by Orvis & Umpqua Feather Merchants. He works as a fly casting instructor and has been credited with a casting method called the misdirection cast.

=== Family ===
Chicone lives in Fort Myers, Florida with his wife and daughter.

== Published works ==
=== Books ===
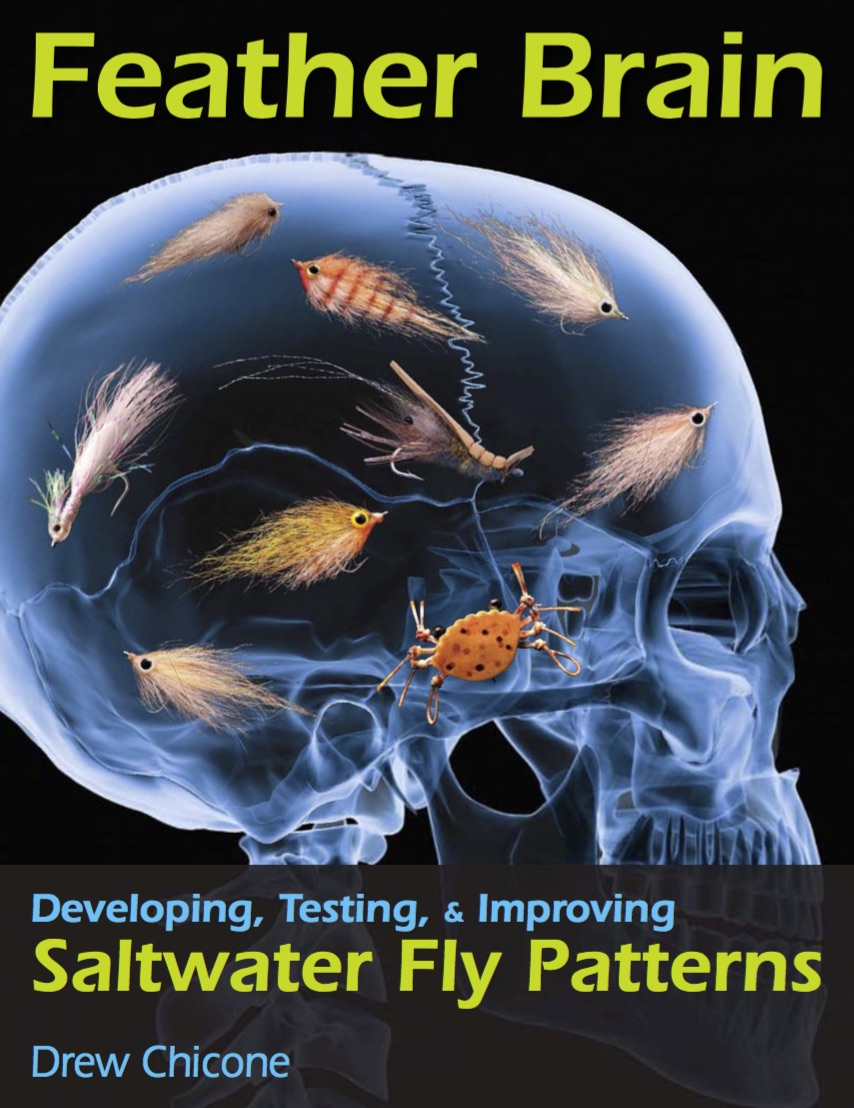
The cover from Chicone's 2013 book, Feather Brain: Developing, Testing, and Improving Saltwater Fly Patterns

- 2013: Navigating the Foodservice Channel: A Guide to Understanding the Foodservice Business, ISBN 978-1481943529
- 2013: Snook Flies: 8 Proven Patterns For Catching Snook From The Beach, ISBN 978-1493614189
- 2013: Feather Brain: Developing, Testing, & Improving Saltwater Fly Patterns, ISBN 978-0811711968
- 2013: Essential Permit Patterns, ISBN 978-1491075753
- 2013: Essential Bonefish Flies, ISBN 978-1484014844
- 2014: Redfish Flies: Eight Effective Patterns for Catching Redfish, ISBN 978-1500481889
- 2017: Baby Tarpon Flies: Six Effective Patterns for Catching Juvenile Tarpon, ISBN 978-1537703220
- 2017: Top Saltwater Flies - Bonefish, ISBN 978-0989523684
- 2017: Top Saltwater Flies - Tarpon, ISBN 978-0989523691
- 2017: Top Saltwater Flies - Permit, ISBN 978-0999309308
- 2018: Largemouth Bass Flies: Seven Effective Patterns For Catching Largemouth Bass, ISBN 978-1724572417
- 2019: Redfish Flies 2: Advanced Techniques for Tying Eight Winning Redfish Patterns, ISBN 978-1795267021
- 2019: Snook Flies 2: Eight Effective Patterns for Catching Backcountry Snook, ISBN 978-1705494608
- 2020: Paddle Board Fly Fishing - A Beginner's Guide to SUP, ISBN 979-8640443271

== Awards ==
- 2017: Winner of the 2017 IFTD (International Fly Tackle Dealer Show) New Product Showcase Award, Saltwater Fly Pattern, "Chicone’s Tuscan Bunny".
- 2016: Winner of the 2016 AFFTA (American Fly Fishing Trade Association) New Product Showcase Award, Saltwater Fly Pattern, "Contraband Crab".
- 2014: Winner of the 2014 IFTD (International Fly Tackle Dealer Show) Iron Fly competition.

== See also ==
- Fly fishing
- Fly tying
- Artificial fly
- Bibliography of fly fishing (fly tying, stories, fiction)
