= Blacker's Art of Fly Making =

1842 work of fly tying literature by William Blacker

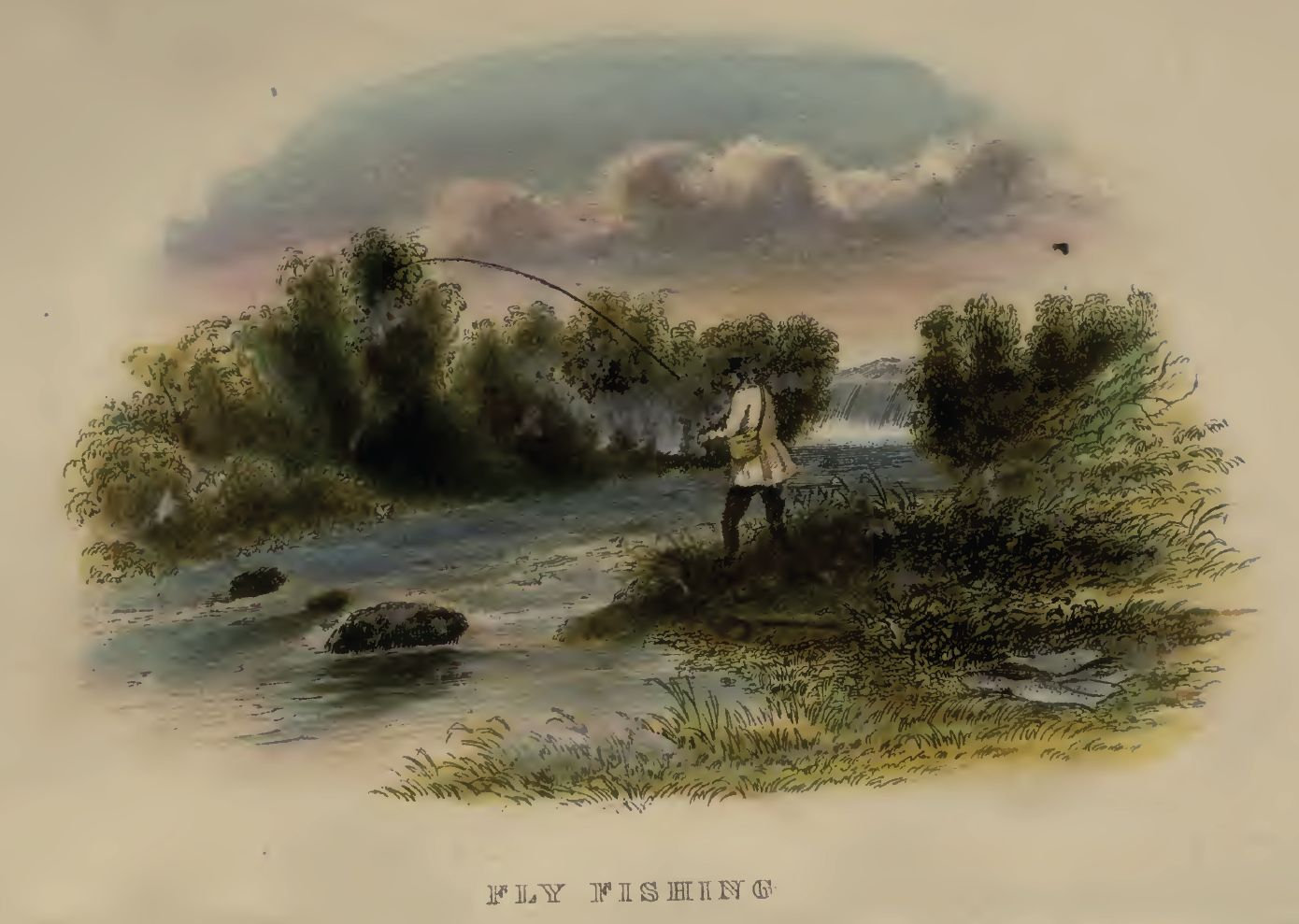
- Frontispiece - Blacker Fly-fishing (1855)
- Author: William Blacker
- Language: English
- Subject: Fly fishing, Fly tying
- Publisher: George Nichols, London
- Publication date: 1842
- Publication place: Great Britain
- Pages: 259 (1855 edition)

Blacker's Art of Fly Making - comprising angling and dyeing of colours with engravings of Salmon and Trout flies shewing the process of the gentle craft as taught in the pages with descriptions of flies for the season of the year as they come out on the water is a work of fly tying literature with significant fly fishing content written by William Blacker, a London tackle dealer and first published in London in 1842 by George Nichols. The 1842 and 1843 editions were only 48 pages while, the 1855 edition was considerably expanded by Blacker with hand-painted, colored illustrations and 252 pages.

== Synopsis ==
Blacker's Art Fly Making is best described by the author himself in the preface to the second edition (1855):

I know not how to apologise for submitting a Second Edition of this little Book to the notice of the Angling few, after the appearance of so many by clever writers, except the many calls I had for It, and a sincere desire of improving farther upon a craft that has not hitherto been clearly promulgated by a real practitioner; consequently my great object is to benefit and amuse my readers, by giving them something practical, which at the present time may be particularly wanted by those who love to make their own flies, whose wants, without doubt, will be found sufficiently supplied in this book; the tyro will appreciate it as valuable to him, and the senior angler who may, perchance, be in possession of it, and who may be singularly fond of making his flies, and amusing himself dyeing the hackles and colours, &c., will, I am persuaded, consider it a treasure.

My endeavours have been unceasing for many years past, in striving to please the great Salmon Fishers and Trout Fishers of this Country, and I must confess that my labours have not been in vain; they have generously conferred upon me their very kind patronage and good will, benefits for which I hold them in very great estimation. Under these circumstances, I have taken much pains to write the book in a befitting manner to suit their tastes and purposes, although my inability in many instances has been an obstacle, nevertheless with all my faults I claim the title of Fisherman, an humble and unimportuned name which no reasonable dispensation can deprive me of.

From my boyhood, I took great delight in ranging along the banks of the beautiful and romantic streams of my native land, Ireland; and having also been for many years a skilful Fly Fisher of no little commendation, in both Great Britain and Hibernia, it is my desire to impart to the world, plainly and easily, the knowledge I have acquired, that all those who wish to become masters of the art, may, by patience and practice, and a close adherence to the instructions I shall lay down, derive the fullest benefit from my experience.

I have endeavoured in the following treatise on Fly-making, to divest the subject, as far as possible, of all technicalities and superfluities; at the same time, I have entered into such full details in the construction of the Fly, that by adopting the process I have pointed out, and following the instructions I have given, the aspirants to the art of Fly-making may speedily become proficients.

In this little book there will be found nothing imaginary, but it is purely written from the practice of angling, so that I may without scruple, justly entitle it The Art of Fly-making, Angling, and Dyeing of Colours. It is also interspersed with many useful remarks that will no doubt agreeably entertain my readers.

No man has taken such pains to improve upon the angler's craft as I; on every article in the whole range of fishing tackle I have made some improvement on rods, flies, lines, reels, and tackle of every sort; and in these pages have left a lasting memorial of my handicraft to the fly-fisher, from whom I have hidden nothing that might retard him in his progress, and who will appreciate it for the great deal of matter propounded in little compass to prevent incumbrance; that the lovers of fly fishing, which has superior claims, may have an opportunity of keeping it in their side pocket,—to be convenient and handy when on their piscatory excursions, the exercise and variety of which will be found advantageous to the health, and the calming of the mind—things not to be purchased; enjoying at the same time the harmonious notes of the warblers of the grove, and musing upon the diversity of the prospects around, while straying along the beautiful streams and vallies of this delightful country.

The list of flies I have given, will be found very valuable, and the tyro will take great delight in imitating these flies necessary for use, and suiting the colours exactly to each, keeping to their symmetrical forms as they appear with his light materials. This beautiful branch of fly-making, peculiarly my own, cannot fail to perfect the angler who is scientific and ingenious, the result of which will be never-failing success.

I have added to the art of fly-making full instructions, and the most approved receipts for dyeing mohair, pighair, feathers, and other materials most useful and appropriate for imitating the natural flies and stuffs the most killing for Trout and Salmon; and which will retain their brilliancy through all the vicissitudes to which they may be exposed.

To bring the Engravings of the flies to the greatest perfection, I have stood at the elbow of the artist who executed this part of the work, that they might be turned out exact to my own models, which renders them and the descriptions more intelligible, as the shade in the fibre of each feather is shown in the plate, in the clearest and finest manner imaginable, that it may be properly seen how these artificial flies are constructed,—the resemblance of those beautiful ones, the productions of the Great Author of Nature, that Trout and Salmon do love to feed upon.

I have also given the principal rivers of England, Ireland, Scotland, and Wales, with the flies best adapted to each, which will enable the fisher to have all things in readiness on his arrival at their localities, and sally out on the finny tribe fearless of disappointment; and for the younger branch of anglers, I have shown the various sorts of fish, with the tackle and baits best adapted to catch them.

The catechism of fly making which I have introduced will be found very curious and instructive to the young beginner, and will afford him every opportunity of retaining the whole process, that when rehearsed in the mind, and perfectly understood, he may apply, with more certain facility, the hand to both material and hook.

Published by the Author, WILLIAM BLACKER, At 54, Dean Street Soho, 1855.

== Reviews ==
- Bell's Life in London, a noted British sporting journal wrote this review in 1855:

Mr. Blacker has been a celebrated trout and salmon angler from early boyhood, and he is known to be the best maker of trout and salmon and flies alive. We have never seen such flies as his, for naturalness of shape, appropriateness of colour and for beauty and solidity of finish. In making flies he has "caught a grace beyond the reach of art" and this he exhibits in the Sanspareil work before us. It contains no fewer than seventeen engravings on steel and copper, of, trout and salmon flies, in every stage of fabrication, from the whipping of hook and gut together to the finishing of the head. These engravings every plate crowded with figures, are executed after his own models and under his own Surveillance and carefully and beautifully coloured, he standing, as he says, "by the artist's elbow". They contain coloured representations of hackles, wing-feathers, fur, silk, tinsel, in their natural state, and prepared for forming the artificial insect. His profusely illustrated instructions for making salmon-flies are entirely original there being nothing at all like them in any work extant, and he must be a dull scholar indeed, who shall not, after brief study of them, become his own salmon fly dresser.

Never, was a book more honestly and conscientiously written. It glows with deep-felt enthusiasm for his art, and with a generous desire of revealing everything that pertains to the perfect acquisition of it in all its branches. It is a work of great labour and long pains-taking, unique at all points, and no one could have written it but a practical angler of long, passionate, and devoted experience in the capture of salmon and salmonidae, and of ne plus ultra perfection in the art of making artificial flies, and concomitantfishing tactle. The work is published by himself, at 54, Dean Street, Soho, and we recommend it more earnestly than we have ever done any other work of the sort.

- In 1921, John Waller Hills in A History of Fly Fishing for Trout wrote:

It is of interest to compare the directions in Barker, Venables and Cotton with those in Blacker, two centuries later. I am referring to Blacker's third book, the Art of Fly-Making (1855). In it he gives the reverse winged fly as the first and easiest pattern; all his directions are very like the earlier writers, with the important difference that his wings were made of two slips. He also gives directions how to wing the other way; but anyone reading the two accounts together will not find much difference.

- Alec Jackson in The American Fly Fisher (1982) wrote:

William Blacker (the Irishman who operated a tackle shop as 54 Dean Street, Soho, London) was acknowledged as one of the best trout and salmon fly dressers of his day. His fly dressing methods are described and illustrated in his book the Art of Fly Making, which first appeared in 1842 and was reissued in 1843 and again in 1855

In 2001, noted fly fishing historian Andrew Herd wrote:

Blacker's advice on fly tying was a radical departure from this predecessor. For a start, he gave totally different methods for tying trout and salmon flies, and much of his writing was taken up by a manual devoted to the details of how to dress individual flies.

Where the salmon fly is concerned, Blacker was the torch that illuminated the night and the pattern he created suddenly lifted the sights of many of his contemporaries. His fame spread so far and wide that is wasn't long before he could afford to charge three pounds for a month's tuition of four hours each day at trout and salmon fly tying.

== Contents ==
From the 1855 Edition

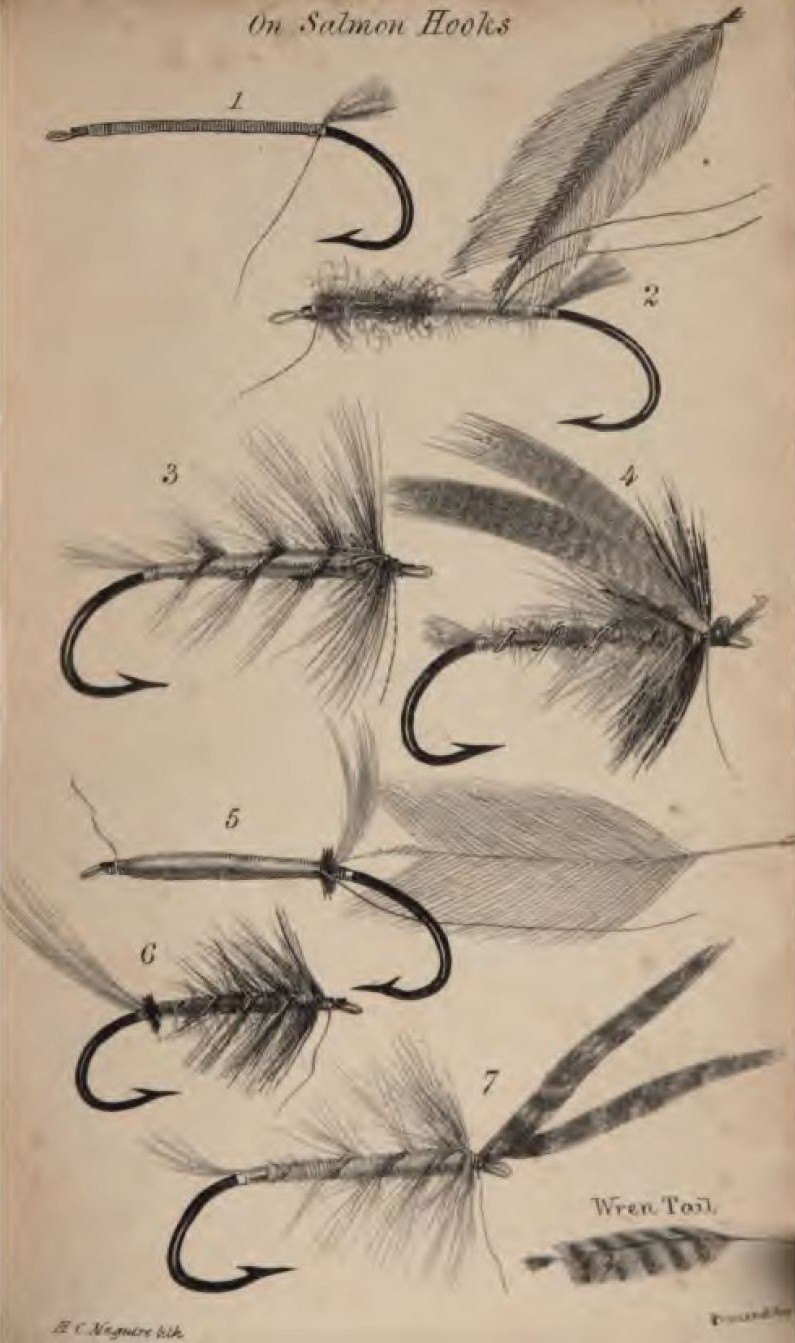
B&W Plate - On Salmon Hooks from 1842 edition

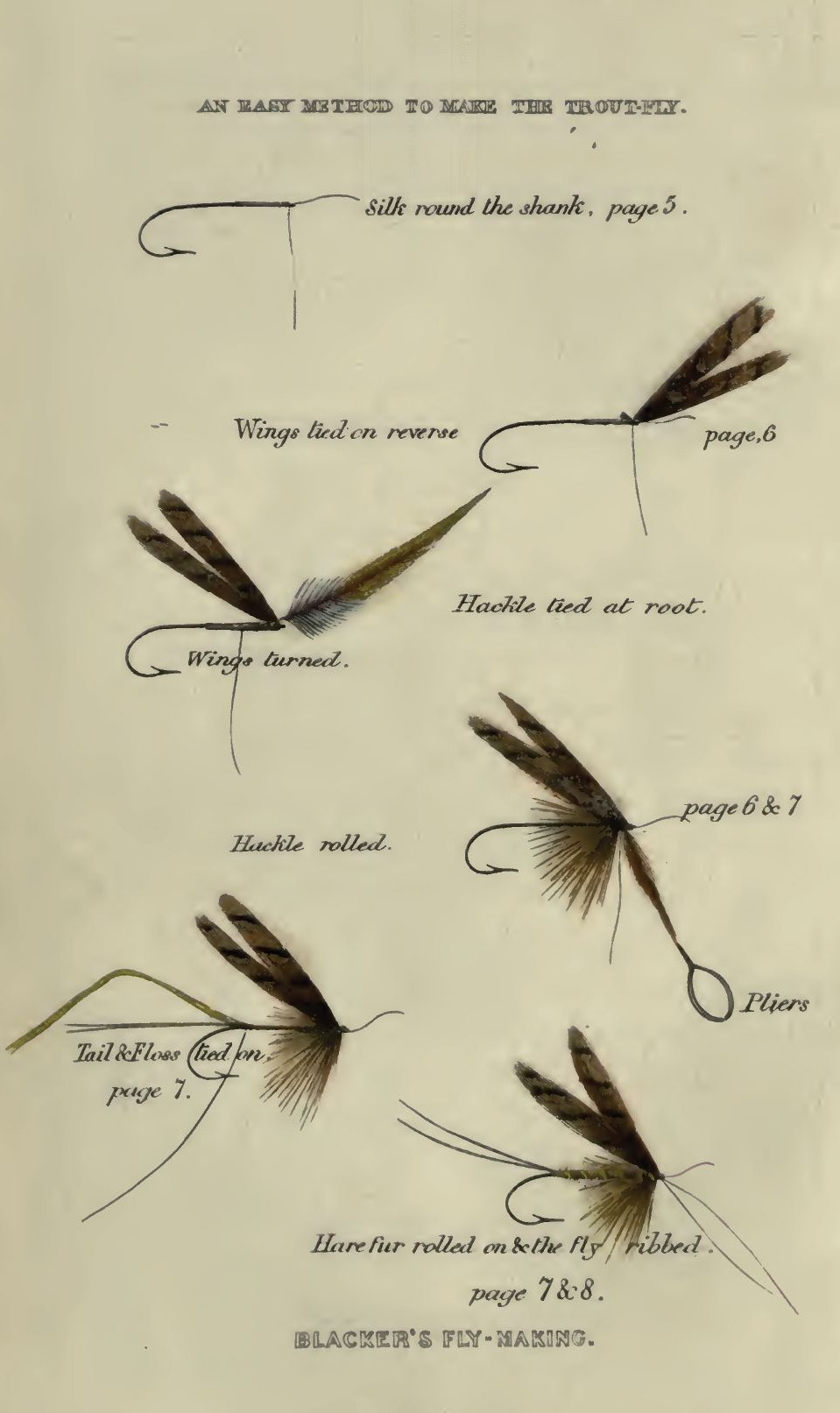
Plate 3 - An easy method to make the Trout-fly (1855)

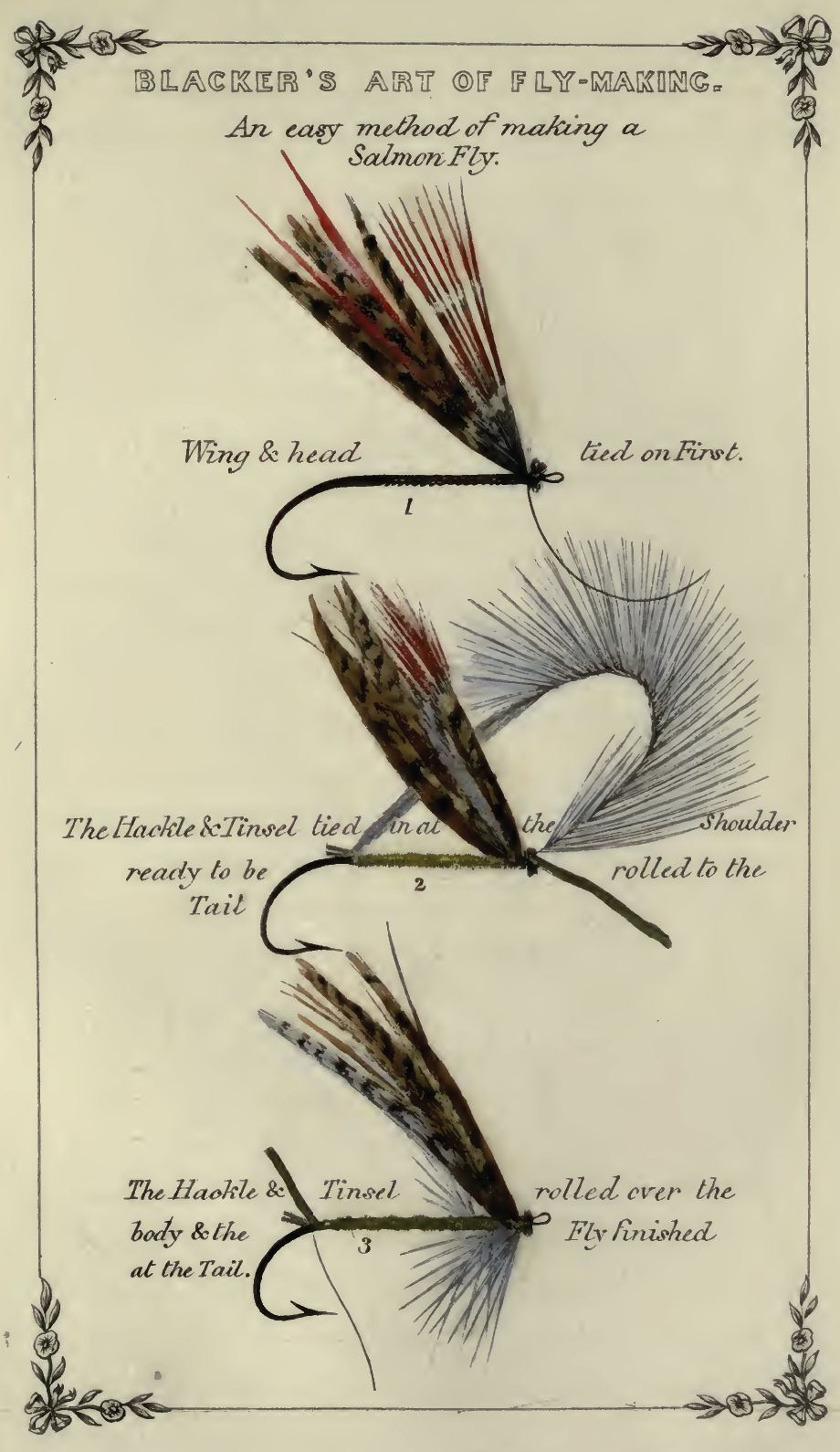
Plate 4-An easy method of making a Salmon-fly (1855)

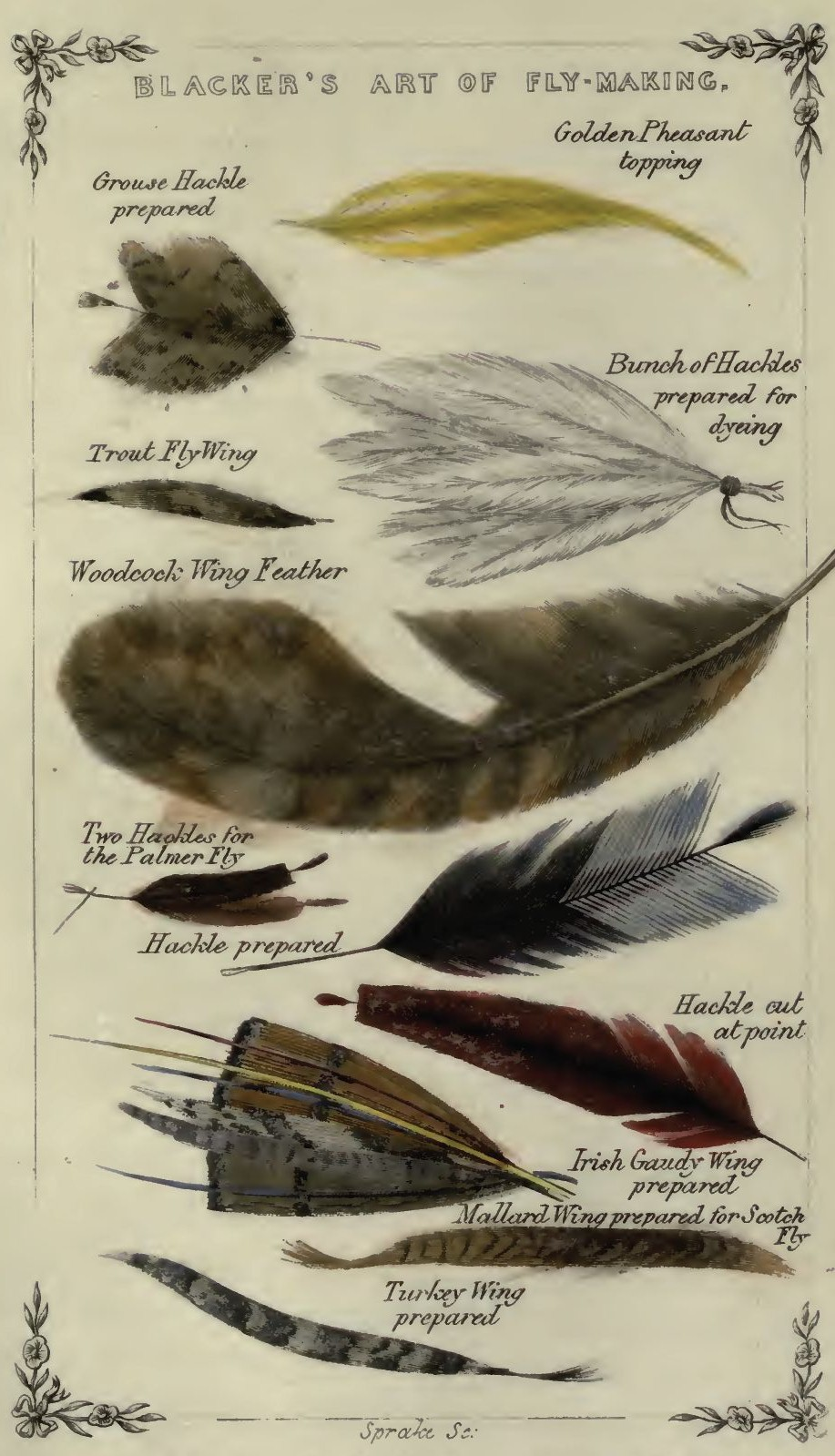
Plate 9 - The Plate of Feathers (1855)

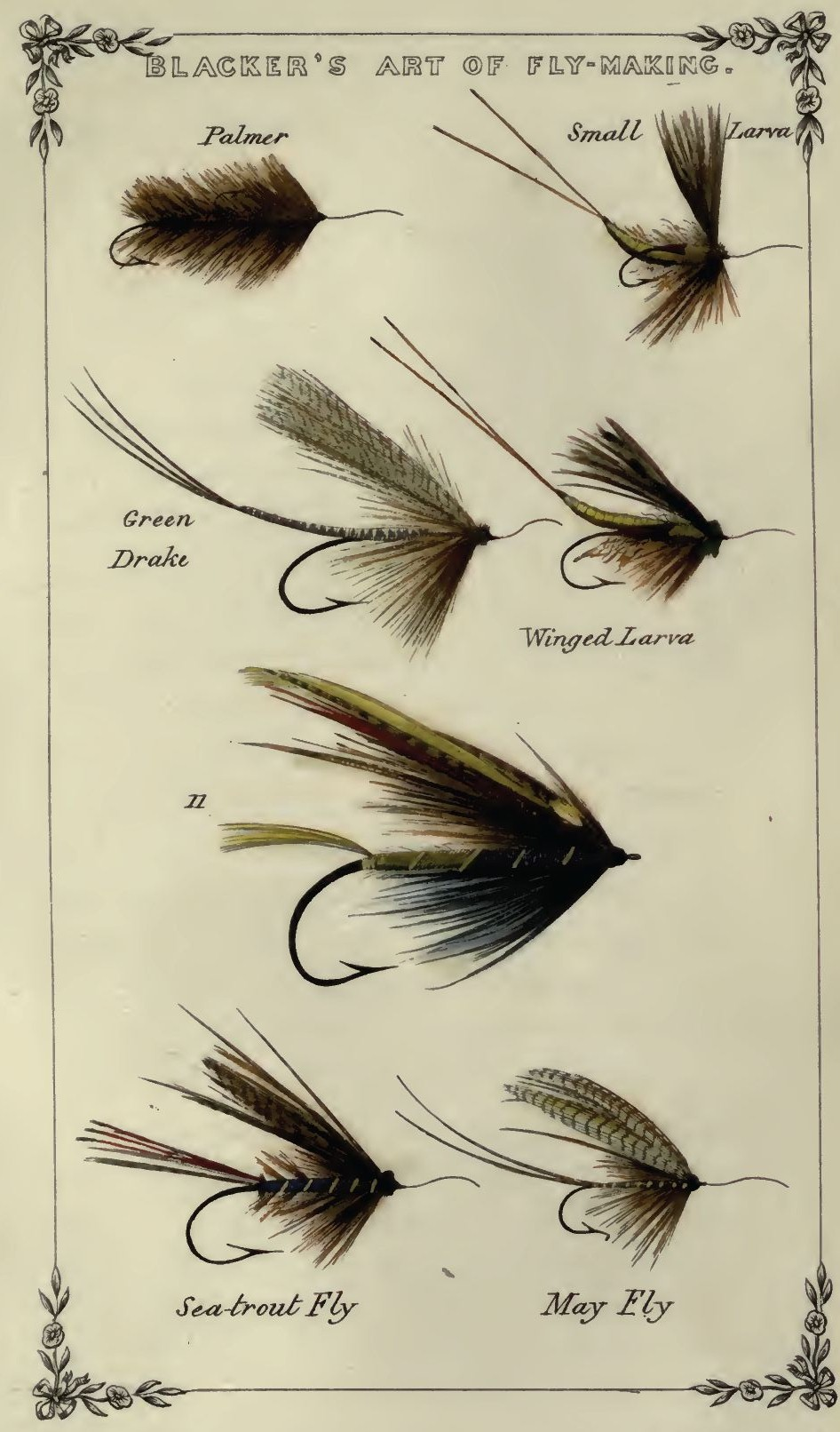
Plate 14 - Plate of Larvas and Green Drakes (1855)

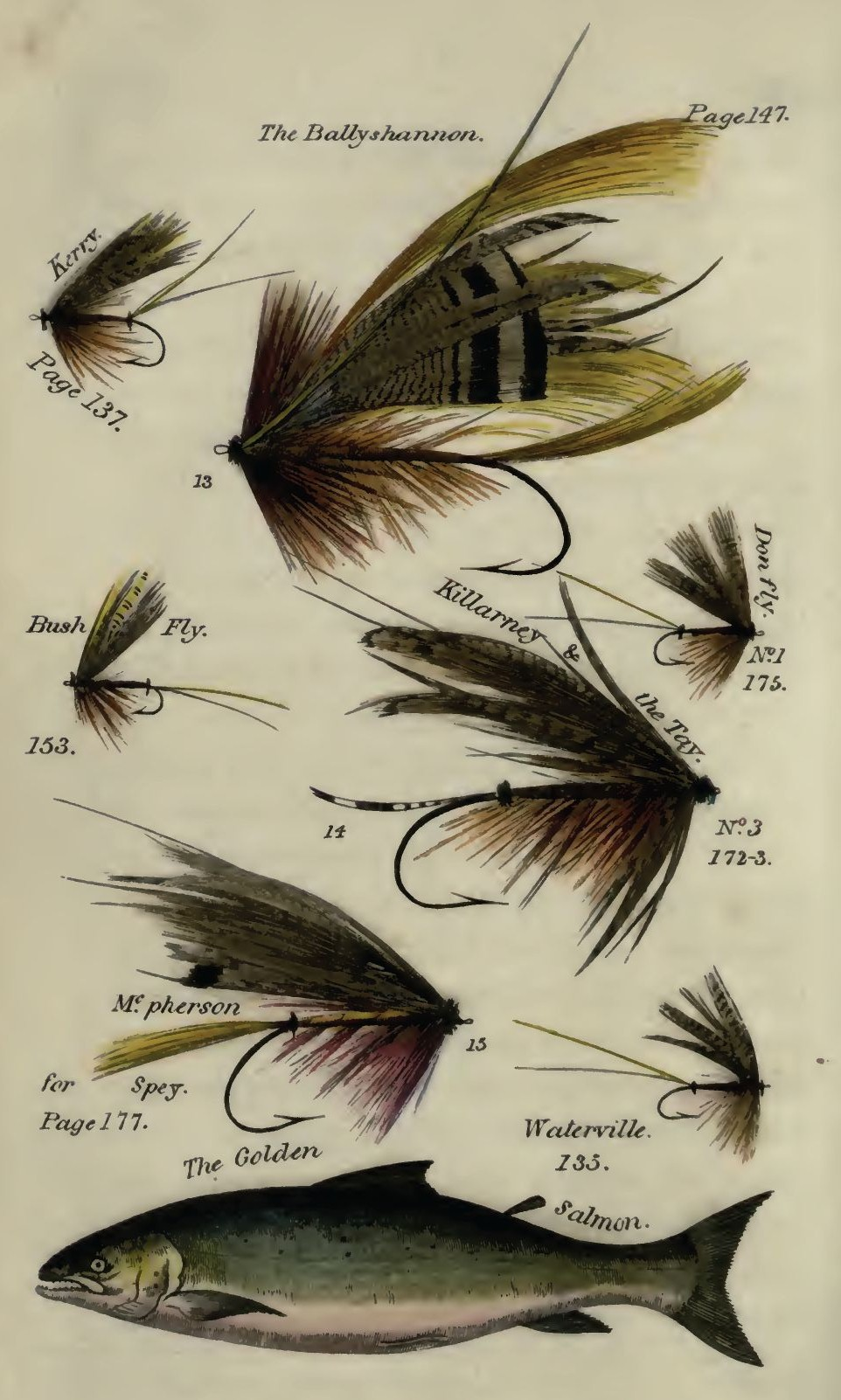
Plate 19 - Plate of 7 Flies and Salmon (1855)

- Contents
  - Preface - v
  - The Art of Fly Making - 1
  - An Easy Method to make the Trout Fly - 3
  - An Easy Method of making a Plain Salmon Fly - 8
  - To make the Trout Fly, in the best and most approved method - 13
  - To make the Palmer, or Double-Hackle Fly - 20
  - How to make the Salmon Fly, as shown in the Beautiful Plate of Engravings on Salmon Hooks - 23
  - Process of making the Gaudy Salmon Fly - 30
  - To make the Winged Larva - 42
  - A Catechism of Fly-Making - 46
  - The Trout Flies for the Season - 55
  - Flies for March - 57
  - Flies for April 60
  - Flies for May - 64
  - Flies for June - 69
  - Flies for July 72
  - Flies for August - 76
  - Fishing Rods and Fly Fishing - 80
  - Fly Fishing for Salmon - 88
  - An Account of the Salmon, and its Varieties - 96
  - The Salmon Fry - 100
  - A Description of the Fifteen Salmon Flies Engraved in the Plates - 104
  - Spring Flies - 117
  - Salmon Rivers - 120
  - The River Tweed - 121
  - The River Shannon - 123
  - The Lakes of Clare - 124
  - The Lakes of Killarney - 126
  - Lough Curran, Waterville - 133
  - Connamara and Ballynahinch - 138
  - Ballyna - 142
  - Ballyshannon - 145
  - The Rivers Bush and Bann - 149
  - The River Bann - 156
  - Lakes of Westmeath 163
  - The River Lee, at Cork - 169
  - Salmon Rivers in Scotland - 170
  - The River Tay - 171
  - The Dee and Don - 176
  - The River Spey - 177
  - The Findhorn - 179
  - Rivers and Lakes adjacent to Fort William, on the Caledonian Canal - 180
  - Salmon Flies for Fort William, &c - 186
  - Salmon Flies for the Ness 187
  - The River Shin - 189
  - The River Thurso - 191
  - The River Esk - 194
  - Loch Leven - 195
  - The River Allan - 196
  - Loch Awe and River - 200
  - The Rivers Irvine, Girvan, and Stincher, in Ayrshire - 203
  - Rivers of Wales.—The Conway - 205
  - The River Dovey - 205
  - The River Tivey - 206
  - The Wye, Monmouth - 207
  - The River Severn - 208
  - The Trent - 209
  - Rivers of York and Derby - 210
  - The Hodder - 211
  - Rivers of Derby - 211
  - The Rivers Wandle and Coin - 212
  - Bait Fishing.—The River Thames - 216
  - Perch - 218
  - Barbel - 219
  - Pike - 221
  - Roach - 224
  - Dace - 226
  - Carp - 226
  - Chub - 227
  - Gudgeons and Minnows - 228
  - Baits - 229
  - The Art of Dyeing Fishing Colours - 232
  - To Dye Yellow - 234
  - To Dye Brown - 236
  - To Dye a Yellow-Brown - 237
  - To Dye Blue - 238
  - To Dye Red - 239
  - To Dye Orange - 240
  - To Dye Purple or Violet - 241
  - To Dye Crimson - 241
  - To Dye Scarlet - 242
  - Crimson Red in Grain - 243
  - To Dye Green Drake Feathers and Fur - 243
  - To Dye Claret - 244
  - Another way to Dye Claret - 246
  - To Dye Black - 246
  - To Dye Greens of various Shades - 246
  - To Dye Lavender or Slate Dun, &c - 247
  - Blues - 248
  - A Silver Grey - 248
  - A Coffee or Chesnut - 249
  - To Dye Olives and a Mixture of Colours - 249
  - A Concise way of Dyeing Colours - 250
  - The Materials necessary for Artificial Fly Making - 256
- List of Plates
  - 1. Blacker Fly-fishing - Frontispiece,
  - 2. Titlepage
  - 3. An easy method to make the Trout-fly - opposite 3
  - 4. An easy method of making a Salmon-fly - 8
  - 5. The best method of making a Trout-fly - 13
  - 6. To make the Palmer's - to face 20
  - 7. How to make the Salmon-fly - 23
  - 8. Process of making the Gaudy Salmon-fly - opposite 30
  - 9. The plate of Feathers - to face 34
  - 10. To make the Winged Larva - 42
  - 11. Plate of Six Flies Catechism - 46
  - 12. Plate of 16 Trout-flies, opposite flies for March - 57
  - 13. Plate of 16 Flies - opposite 65
  - 14. Plate of Larvas and Green Drakes - opposite 78
  - 15. Plate of Gaudy Flies, Nos, 1, 2, 3, - opposite 105
  - 16. Plate of three Salmon-flies, Nos. 4, 5, 6, - opposite 108
  - 17. Plate of four Flies, Nos. 7, 8, 9, 10 - 110
  - 18. Large Spring Salmon-fly - 116
  - 19. Plate of 7 Flies and Salmon - to face 145
  - 20. Plate of Minnow tackle, &c. - to face 216
  - 21. Plate of Pike tackle, &c - 221
  - 22. Paternoster and Barbel tackle - 230

== Other Editions ==
From Antiquarian Book Exchange and Bibliotheca Piscatoria-A Catalogue Of Books On Angling, The Fisheries and Fish-Culture, With Bibliographical Notes and an Appendix Of Citations Touching On Angling and fishing from Old English authors, Westwood and Satchell (1883)

- Blacker, William (1843). Blacker's Art of Fly-making (1st edition, 2nd printing ed.). London: George Nichols.
- Blacker, William (1855). Blacker's Art of Fly-making (2nd ed.). London: George Nichols.
- Blacker, William (1994). Blacker's Art of Fly-making (Flyfisher's Classic Library 1855 reprint ed.). Devon: Bovey Tracy.
- Blacker, William (1994). Blacker's Art of Fly-making (1855 reprint ed.). Lanham, MD: Derrydale Press.

== See also ==
- Bibliography of fly fishing
