= Clouser Deep Minnow =

Type of fishing lure

- Artificial fly
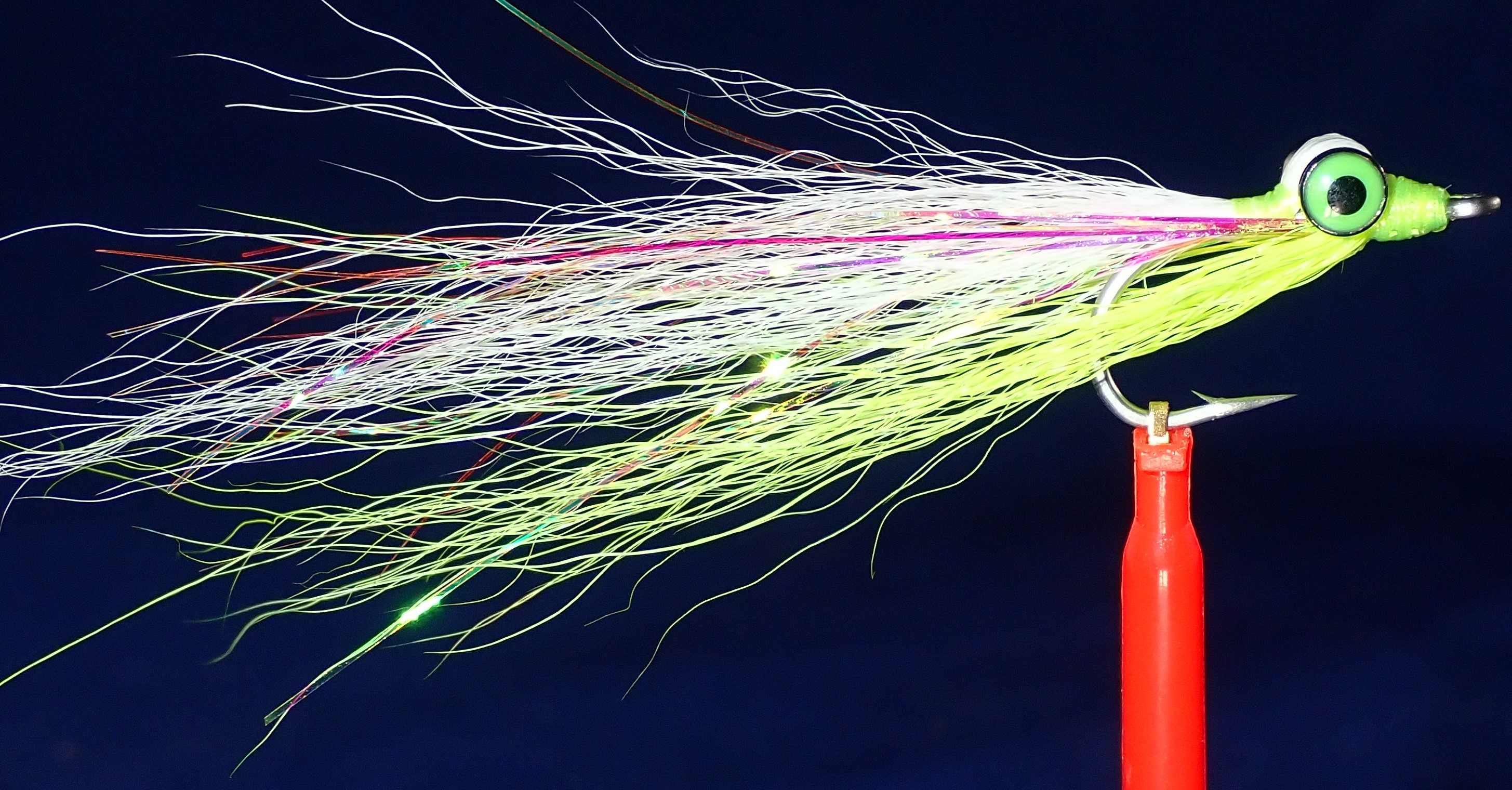
- Traditional Chartreuse Clouser Deep Minnow
- Type: Streamer
- Imitates: Baitfish

History
- Creator: Bob Clouser
- Created: 1987

Materials
- Typical sizes: 1/0 – 10
- Typical hooks: TMC 811S
- Thread: 6/0 nylon matching underwing colors
- Tail: None
- Body: None
- Wing: Bucktail, white underwing and brown, gray, chartreuse overwing with flash
- Head: Thread color
- Bead: Dumb bell eyes painted red or chartreuse

Uses
- Primary use: Fresh and saltwater baitfish imitation for multiple species

Reference(s)
- Pattern references: Clouser's Flies (2006), Bob Clouser

The Clouser Deep Minnow is an artificial fly commonly categorized as a streamer and is fished under the water surface. It is a popular and widely used pattern for both freshwater and saltwater game fish and is generally listed as one of the top patterns to have in any fly box, especially for bass and saltwater flats fishing.

== Origin ==
The original Clouser Deep Minnow evolved from traditional bucktail streamers and was created in 1987 by Bob Clouser, a Pennsylvania fly shop owner and guide. The original patterns were intended for smallmouth bass on the Susquehanna River. The name Clouser Deep Minnow was coined by Lefty Kreh, a noted Fly Fishing writer in a 1989 article in Fly Fisherman. Today, the Clouser Deep Minnow is widely used for many species of both fresh and saltwater game fish. Lefty Kreh claims to have caught over 87 species of game fish on Clouser Deep Minnow flies.

I believe that this pattern is the most important and effective underwater fly developed in the past 20 years. During the past three years I have been able to catch 63 species of fish in fresh and saltwaters around the world with this pattern!

— Lefty Kreh 1994 in The Professionals' Favorite Flies

== Imitates ==
The Clouser Deep Minnow is an imitation of a baitfish, although there are many variations intended to imitate very specific baitfish in different fresh and saltwater situations.

== Materials ==
The original Clouser Deep Minnow pattern was tied with bucktail and krystal flash. However today, Clouser Deep Minnows are tied in a wide variety of color combinations and material combinations. The widespread availability of synthetic hair-like materials today, make the creation of an almost infinite number of Clouser Deep Minnow variations possible. The originals were tied on a number 2 saltwater hook with either a white bucktail belly, gold krystal flash and natural brown bucktail wing or white belly, silver krystal flash and gray dyed bucktail.

== Variations and sizes ==
Clouser Deep Minnow flies are typically tied on number 1/0 to 10 short to long hooks, with lead, brass or tungsten dumbbell eyes.

Clouser Deep Minnows
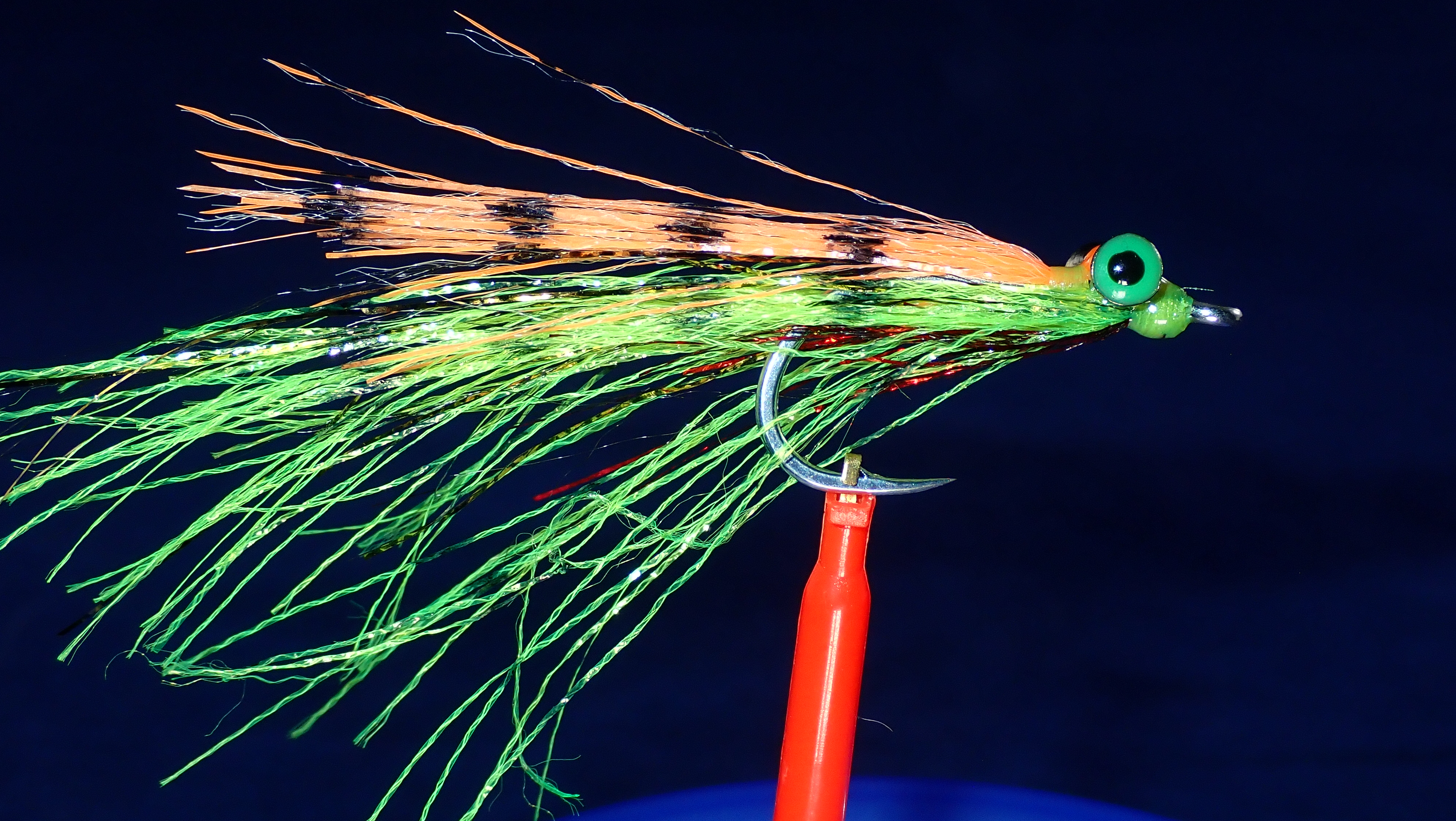
Fire Tiger Clouser Deep Minnow

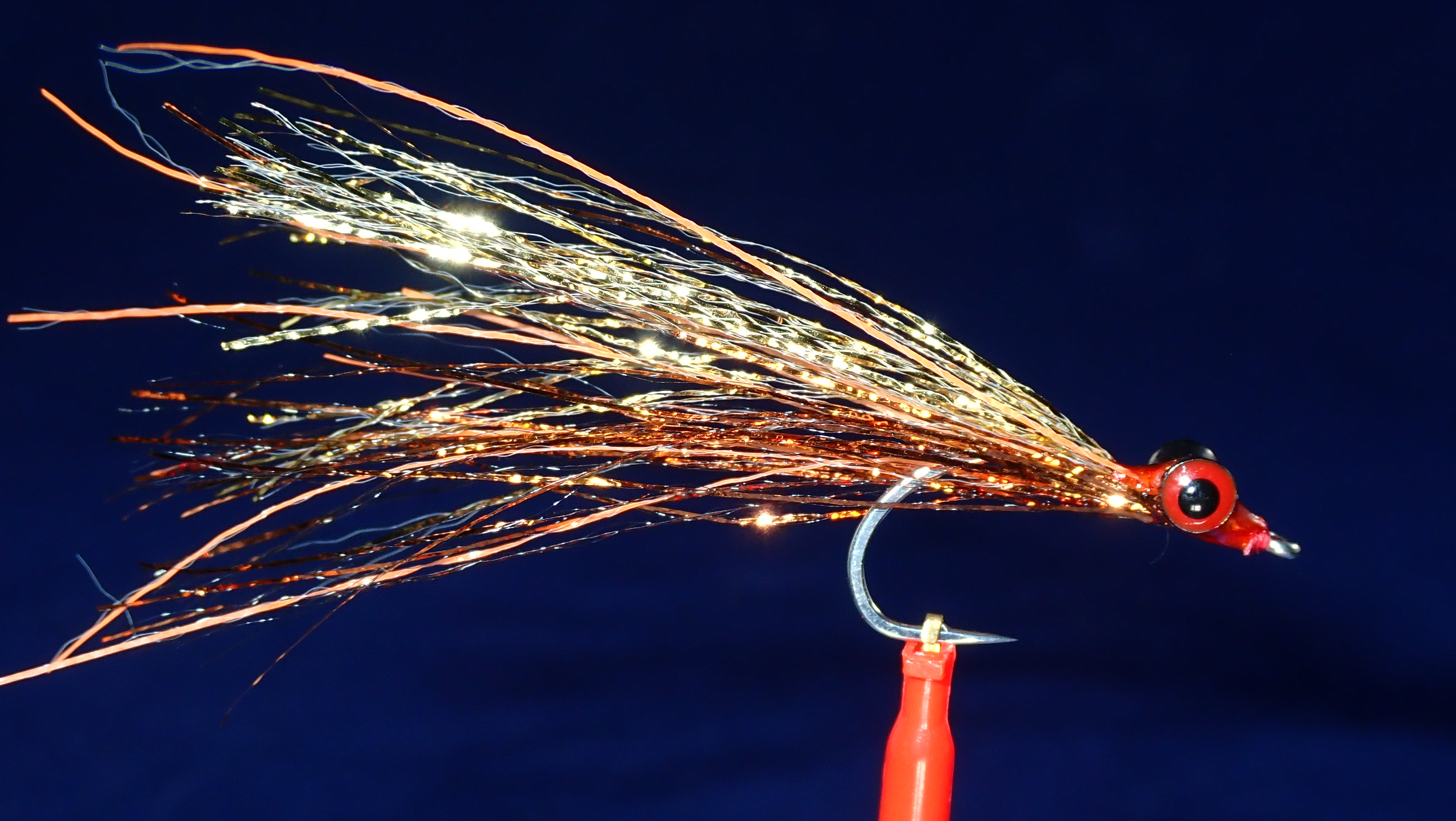
Gold and Copper Clouser Deep Minnow

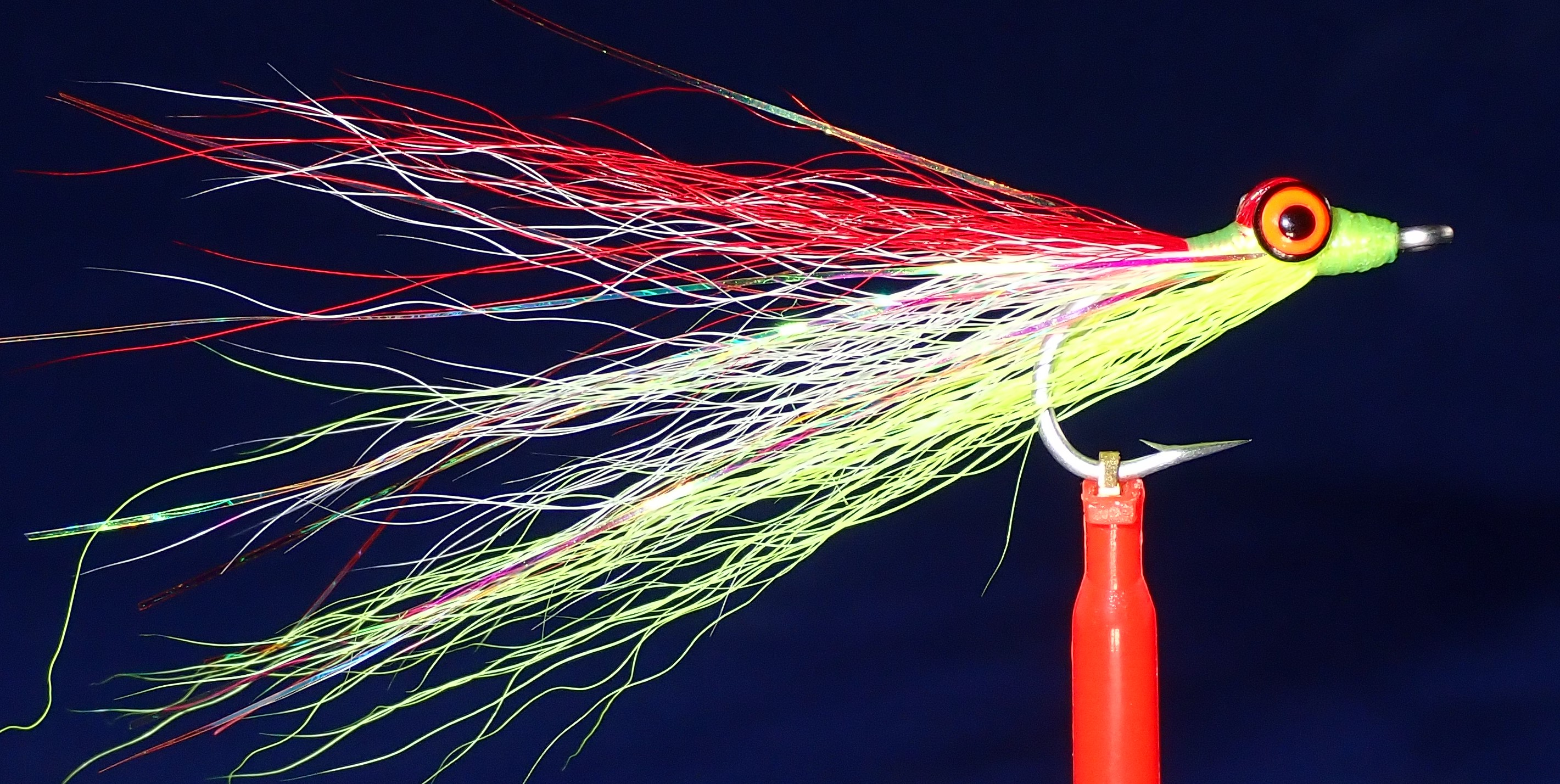
Chartreuse and Red Clouser Deep Minnow

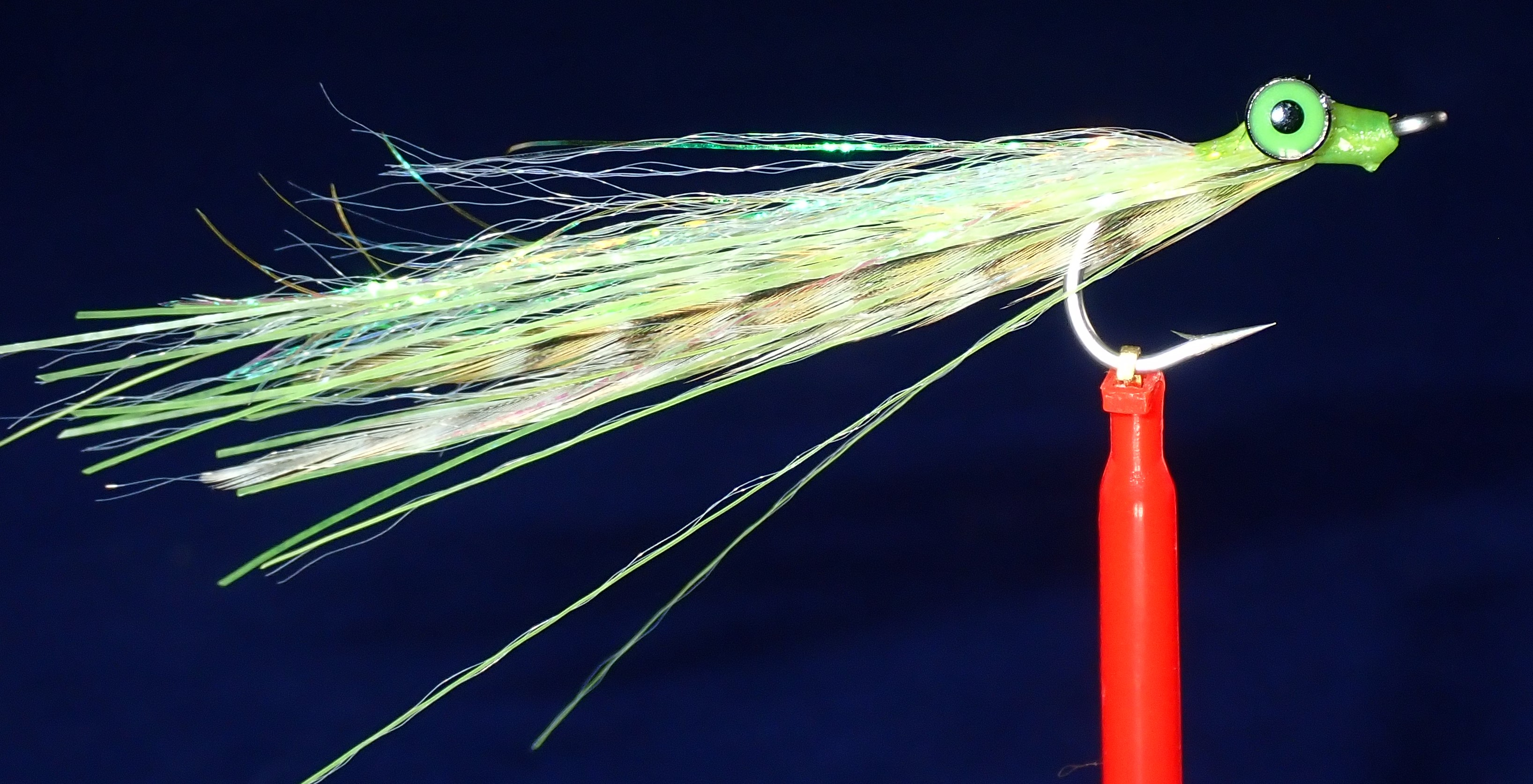
Chartreuse Feather Wing Clouser Deep Minnow
