= Annotated bibliography =

Bibliography that gives a summary of each of the entries

An annotated bibliography is a bibliography that gives a summary of each of the entries. The purpose of annotations is to provide the reader with a summary and an evaluation of each source. Each summary should be a concise exposition of the source's central idea(s) and give the reader a general idea of the source's content.

== Main components of annotated bibliographies ==
The following are the main components of an annotated bibliography. Not all these fields are used; fields may vary depending on the type of annotated bibliography and instructions from the instructor if it is part of a school assignment.

- Full bibliographic citation: the necessary and complete bibliographical information i.e. (author, title, publisher and date, etc.),
- Author's background: the name, authority, experience, or qualifications of the author.
- Purpose of the work: the reasons why the author wrote the work
- Scope of the work: the breadth or depth of coverage and topics or sub-topics covered.
- Main argument: State the main informative points of the paper
- Audience: For whom was it written (general public, subject specialists, student?
- Methodology: What methodology and research methods did the work employ?
- Viewpoint: What is the author's perspective or approach (school of thought, etc.)? E.g., an unacknowledged bias, or any undefended assumptions?
- Sources: Does the author cite other sources, and if so, what types? Is it based on the author's own research? Is it personal opinion?
- Reliability of the source: How reliable is the work?
- Conclusion: What does the author conclude about the work? Is the conclusion justified by the work?
- Features: Any significant extras, e.g. visual aids (charts, maps, etc.), reprints of source documents, an annotated bibliography?
- Strengths and Weaknesses: What are the strengths and weaknesses of the work?
- Comparison: How does the source relate to other works done by other writers on the topic: does it agree or disagree with another author or a particular school of thought; are there other works which would support or dispute it?
- Voice / Personal Conclusion: Provide an opinion of the work or a reaction to the source based on other available works, prior knowledge of the subject matter or knowledge pools done by other researchers.

== Types of annotations ==
Annotations may be written with different goals in mind. There are three types of annotations, depending on what might be most important for the reader or according to a professor's instructions. It is impossible to describe a standard procedure for all types of annotations because one annotation does not fit all purposes. In order to know the best type of annotation, it is prudent to consult the instructor or follow the instructions. For example, if an assignment states that an annotative bibliography should give evidence proving an analytical understanding of the sources used, then an analytical annotated bibliography which includes evaluation of the sources should be written. The three types of annotated bibliographies are; summary annotations, critical annotations and a combination of the former two.

Summary annotations

Summary annotations are further classified into informative and indicative annotations.

The following are the main features of summary annotations:

- They show a summary of the source content
- They highlight the arguments and proofs/evidence mentioned in the work
- They sometimes describe the author's methodology and any theories used
- They offer the conclusion of the source
- They do not evaluate the work they are discussing

Informative Annotations

This type of annotation is a summary of the source. An informative annotation should include the thesis of the work, arguments or hypothesis, proofs and a conclusion.

Informative annotations provide a straight summary of the source material.

They summarise all relevant information about the author and the main points of the work.

To write an informative annotation, begin by writing the thesis; then develop it with the argument or hypothesis, list the proofs, and state the conclusion

Indicative annotated bibliographies

Indicative annotations do not provide actual information from the source.

They provide overall information about what kinds of questions or issues are addressed by the work, for example, through chapter titles.

In the indicative entry, there is no attempt to give actual data such as hypotheses, proofs, etc.

=== Evaluative annotations ===
This type of annotation assesses the source's strengths and weaknesses, in terms of usefulness and quality.

Evaluative annotated bibliographies do more than just summarising, they provide critical appraisals.

They evaluate the source or author critically to find any biases, lack of evidence, objectives, etc.

They show how the work may or may not be useful for a particular field of study or audience.

They explain how researching the material assisted a project.

=== Combination annotations ===
Most annotated bibliographies contain combination annotations. This type of annotation will summarize or describe the topic, and then evaluate the source's usefulness and a summary. Usually also includes a detailed analysis on the reason the article was written.

== Formats of writing annotated bibliographies ==
Annotated bibliographies contain two main sections; the bibliographic information section and the annotations section.

Since the formats may slightly vary from one institution to another and amongst scholars and researchers depending on the regulations, courses and materials being annotated, it is imperative to ask for specific guidelines.

The bibliographic information

There are also bibliography annotations that combine all three types (MLA, APA and Chicago style). When deciding on the style for an annotated bibliography, one should consider its purpose and the instructions given. Regardless of the formatting style required, all annotated bibliography pieces need to follow the same rule: the author's last name should be the only part that is flush left, while the rest of the text requires to be indented.

The bibliographic information is written before the annotation using the suitable referencing style. The information is normally identified using a hanging indent.

Generally, though, the bibliographic information of the source (the title, author, publisher, date, etc.) is written in either MLA or APA format.

The annotations

The annotations for each source are written in paragraph form.

The lengths of the annotations can vary significantly from a couple of sentences to a couple of pages.

The length of the annotation should be between 100 and 200 words.

When writing summaries of sources, the annotations may not be very long.

However, when writing an extensive analysis of each source, more space may be needed.

A few sentences of general summary followed by several sentences of how the work fits into a larger paper or project that can be useful when writing a draft.

== Writing ==
Sample entry of an APA style annotated bibliography:

Murray, S. (2009). The library: An illustrated history (ALA ed.). Chicago, IL: Skyhorse Publishing.

Murray's book offers an in-depth look at the history of libraries since ancient times. He
incorporates beautiful illustrations, quotations, and descriptions of numerous libraries
worldwide. This book states the history of the evolution of the book from era to era.
It also serves as a primary source of information for research in library history. This
is a good book that should be of interest to book lovers and librarians.
