= A History of Fly Fishing for Trout =

1921 fly fishing book by John Waller

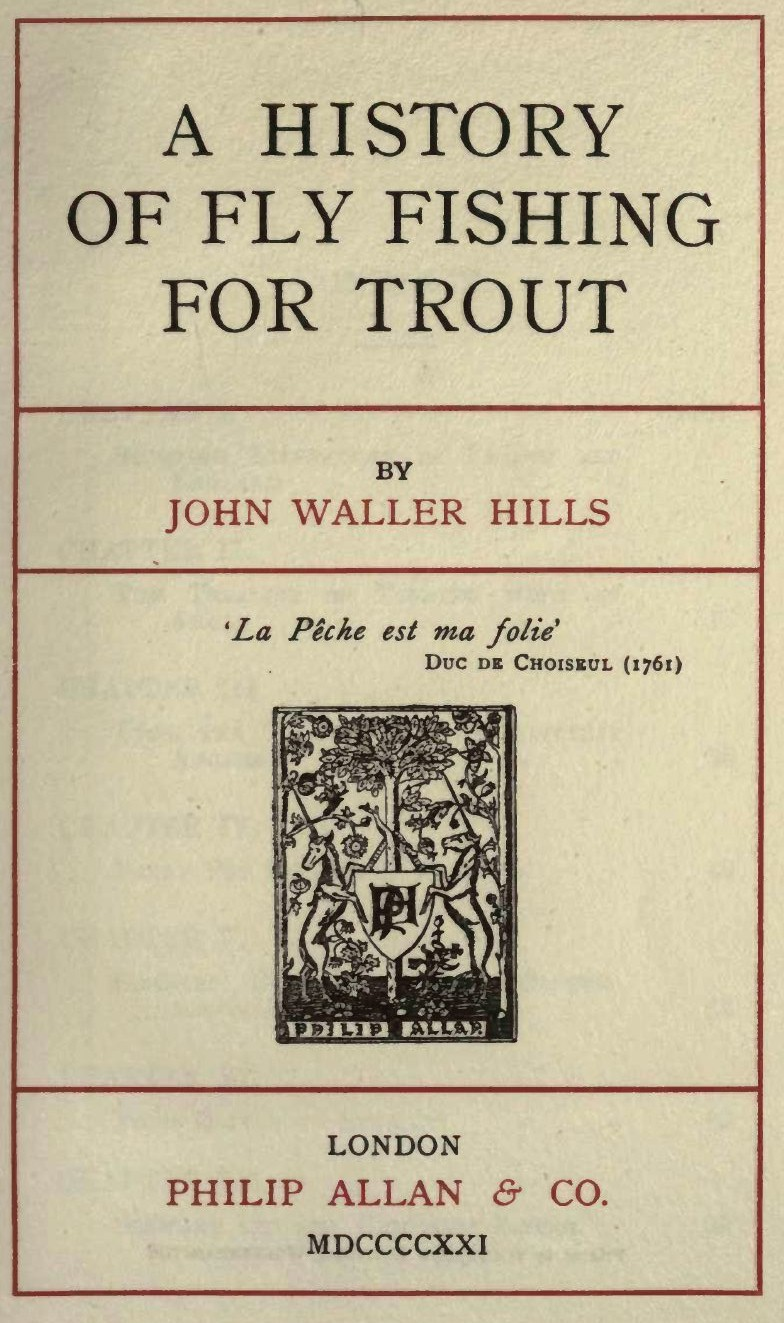
- Title page
- Author: John Waller Hills
- Language: English
- Subject: Fly fishing
- Publisher: Phillip Allan & Co, London
- Publication date: 1921
- Publication place: England
- Pages: 244
- Followed by: A Summer on the Test (1925)

A History of Fly Fishing for Trout is a fly fishing book written by John Waller Hills published in London in 1921.

== Synopsis ==
A History of Fly Fishing for Trout is the first book to trace the history of fly fishing from its very beginning, with chapters on Early Sporting Literature, Early Fly Fishing in France, and identifying all the artificial flies mentioned by early writers. The book includes a useful bibliography for scholars interested in further historical research.

== Reviews ==
- In Notable Angling Literature (1945) James Robb devotes an entire chapter to Hills and says the following about A History:

It covers the period from the close of the 15th century to the beginning of the 20th, from the Treatyse to Andrew Lang. The story is very well told and must have involved considerable research. Generous in his appreciations, he can always be relied upon to give an unbiased judgement. The book sets a high standard and one can refer to him with confidence on moot points in angling literature on trout fly-fishing.

- In The Well Tempered Angler (1965) Arnold Gingrich listed Hill's A History of Fly Fishing for Trout as one of three books to refer to when seeking guidance on angling literature.

All three of these writers—Robb, Hills and Marston—get at the real meaning of the old writers, quote them and characterize them, point out the significance of their contributions, and show both where they are still valid and where later developments have improved them.

- Andrew Herd credits Hill with the first attempt to codify the history of fly fishing, albeit Hill's work shows a distinctly British bias and disregard for other European influences.
- Hills and A History is extensively quoted and referenced in the following works,:
  - John McDonald, Quill Gordon (1972)
  - Arnold Gingrich, The Fishing in Print (1974)
  - Paul Schullery, American Fly Fishing—A History (1996)
  - Andrew Herd, The Fly (2003)

== Contents ==
- Chapter I – Sporting Literature in France and England – 1
- Chapter II – The Treatise of Fishing with an Angle – 16
- Chapter III – From The Treatise to The Compleat Angler – 36
- Chapter IV – Early Fly Fishing in France – 49
- Chapter V – Charles Cotton and His Contemporaries – 56
- Chapter VI – From Cotton to Stewart – 82
- Chapter VII – Stewart and the Upstream School – 99
- Chapter VIII – The Dry Fly – 114
- Chapter IX – The Evolution of the Trout Fly – 141
- Chapter X – The Evolution of the Trout Fly (Contd.) – 170
- Chapter XI – The Literature of Fly Fishing – 191
- Bibliography – 222
- Index – 231

== Other Editions ==
- Hills, John Waller (1921). The A History of Fly Fishing for Trout (1st Limited Edition (50) Signed ed.). London: Phillip Allan & Co.
- Hills, John Waller (1923). The A History of Fly Fishing for Trout (1st Edition U.S. ed.). New York: Frederick A. Stokes.
- Hills, John Waller (1971). The A History of Fly Fishing for Trout (1st Edition Reprint ed.). Rockville Centre, NY: Freshlet Press.
- Hills, John Waller (1973). The A History of Fly Fishing for Trout (3rd ed.). London: Barry Shurlock. ISBN 0-903330-04-0.
- Hills, John Waller (1995). A History of Fly Fishing for Trout (Flyfisher's Classic Library 1921 Facsimile ed.). Wales, UK: Bovey Tracy.
- Hills, John Waller (1997). The A History of Fly Fishing for Trout (Collectors Edition Reprint ed.). Norwalk CT: Easton Press.

== See also ==
- Bibliography of fly fishing
