= Baggallay =

Baggallay is a surname. Notable people with the surname include:

- Ernest Baggallay (1850–1931), English barrister and politician
- Mervyn Baggallay (1887–1961), English cricketer
- Richard Baggallay (1816–1888), British barrister, politician, and judge
- Richard Baggallay (cricketer) (1884–1975), English army officer and cricketer
- Thomas Baggallay] (1847–1929), English solicitor and cricketer

== See also ==
- Gopal Bagalay, High Commissioner of India to Australia
- Bagguley, surname
- Baggley, surname
- Baguley (disambiguation)
