= Bibliography of Yellowstone National Park =

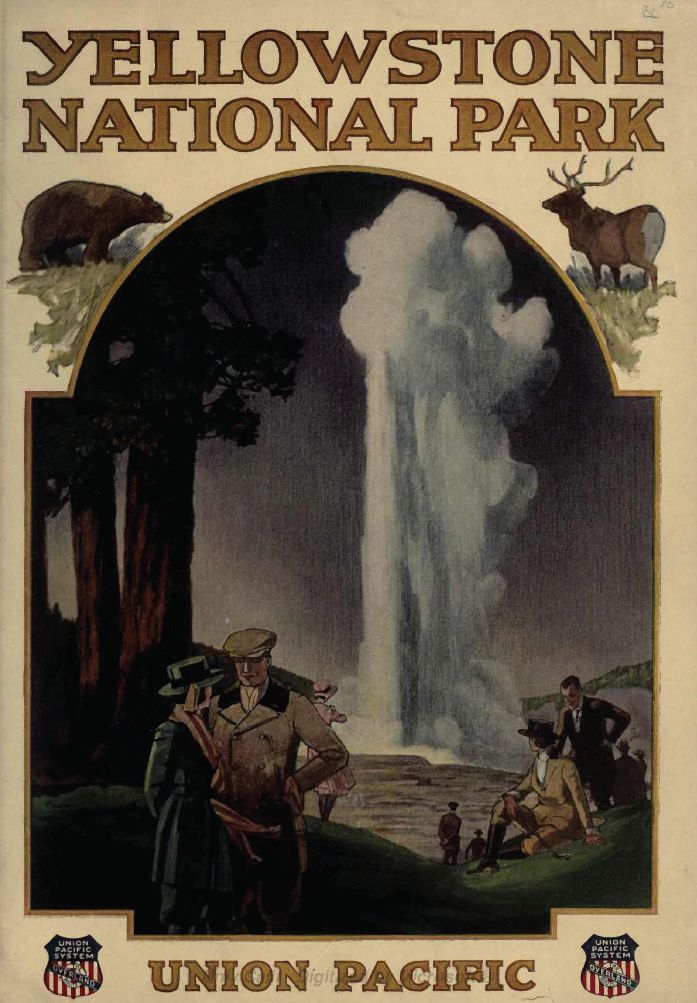
Union Pacific railroad brochure

The bibliography of Yellowstone National Park identifies English language historic, scientific, ecological, cultural, tourism, social, and advocacy books, journals and studies on the subject of Yellowstone National Park topics published since 1870 and documented in Yellowstone related bibliographies and other related references.

== Ecology ==
The following references are primarily focused on the ecology of the park.

- Skinner, P. M. (1921). The Yellowstone Nature Book. Chicago: A. C. McClurg.

== Fauna ==
The following references are primarily focused on the history, taxonomy and management of the park's animal wildlife.

- Bartlett, Richard A. (1974). Nature's Yellowstone. Albuquerque, NM: University of New Mexico Press. ISBN 9780826302571.
- Birds of Yellowstone: a Practical Habitat Guide to the Birds of Yellowstone National Park- and Where to Find Them. Boulder, CO: Robert Rinehart Inc. 1988. ISBN 0-911797-44-0.
- Brodrick, Harold J. (1952). Birds of Yellowstone National Park: A Descriptive Check List of the Birds of Yellowstone with Helpful Illustrations. Yellowstone National Park.
- Fischer, Hank (1995). Wolf Wars-The Remarkable Inside Story of the Restoration of Wolves to Yellowstone. Helena, MT: Falcon Press Publishing. ISBN 1-56044-352-9.
- Follett, Dick (1975). Birds of Yellowstone and Grand Teton National Parks. Yellowstone Library and Museum Association. ISBN 0-911797-14-9.
- Hague, Arnold (1893). The Yellowstone Park as a Game Reservation. New York: Forest and Stream Publishing Co.
- Murie, Adolph (1940). Fauna of the National Parks of the United States-Ecology of the Coyote in the Yellowstone National Park (Report). U.S. Department of the Interior. Archived from the original on July 3, 2007.
- Schullery, Paul, ed. (1996). The Yellowstone Wolf-A Guide and Sourcebook. Worland, WY: High Plains Publishing. ISBN 1-881019-13-6.
- Schullery, Paul; Whittlesey, Lee (July 2001). "Mountain Goats in the Greater Yellowstone Ecosystem: A Prehistoric and Historical Context". Western North American Naturalist. 61 (3).
- Wilkinson, Todd (1992). Yellowstone Wildlife A Watcher's Guide. Minocqua, WI: NorthWord Press. ISBN 1-55971-140-X.
- Zardus, Maurice J. (1967). Birds of Yellowstone and Grand Teton National Parks. Salt Lake City, UT: Wheelright Press.
- Zarki, J.; Follett, R. (1987). A Checklist, Birds of Yellowstone National Park.

== Fisheries ==
The following references are primarily focused on the history, taxonomy and management of, and angling in the park's fisheries:

- Back, Howard (1938). The Waters of the Yellowstone with Rod and Fly. New York: Dodd & Mead.
- Brooks, Charles E. (1979). The Living River—A Fisherman's Intimate Profile of the Madison River Watershed—Its History, Ecology, Lore and Angling Opportunities. Garden City, NJ: Nick Lyons Books. ISBN 0-385-15655-3.
- Brooks, Charles E. (1984). Fishing Yellowstone Waters. Clinton, NJ: New Win Publishing Inc. ISBN 0-8329-0353-1.
- Holt, John (1993). River Journal—Madison. Portland, OR: Frank Amato Publications. ISBN 1-878175-27-0.
- Hughes, Dave (1992). The Yellowstone River and its Angling. Portland, OR: Frank Amato Publications. ISBN 1-878175-23-8.
- Kendall, W. C. (1915). The Fishes of the Yellowstone National Park. Washington D.C.: Department of Commerce, Bureau of Fisheries.
- Kendall, W. C.; Smith, Hugh M. (1921). The Fishes of the Yellowstone National Park—With Description of Park Waters and Notes on Fishing. Washington D.C.: Department of Commerce, Bureau of Fisheries.,
- Klahowya (1910). Fly Fishing in Wonderland. Chicago: O. P. Barnes.
- Matthews, Craig; Juracek, John (1987). Fly Patterns of Yellowstone. West Yellowstone, MT: Blue Ribbon Flies.
- Matthews, Craig; Juracek, John (1992). Fishing Yellowstone Hatches. West Yellowstone, MT: Blue Ribbon Flies.
- Schullery, Paul (Spring 1982). "Yellowstone Fishes in the Mind of Man". The American Fly Fisher. 9 (2): 23–28.
- Schweber, Nate (2012). Fly Fishing Yellowstone National Park-An Insider's Guide to the 50 Best Places. Mechanicsburg, PA: Stackpole Books. ISBN 978-0811710510.
- Staples, Bruce (1996). "Yellowstone Park". River Journal. 4 (1). Portland, OR: Frank Amato.
- Varley, John D.; Schullery, Paul (1998). Yellowstone Fishes-Ecology, History, and Angling in the Park. Mechanicsburg, PA: Stackpole Books. ISBN 0-8117-2777-7.
- Walinchus, Rod; Travis, Tom (1995). Fly Fishing The Yellowstone River. Boulder, CO: Pruett Publishing. ISBN 0-87108-861-4.
- Waterman, Charles F. (1986). Mist on the River—Remembrances of Dan Bailey. Livingston, MT: Yellowstone Press. ISBN 0-9617253-0-3.

== Flora ==
The following references are primarily focused on the history, taxonomy and management of the park's flora.

- Harshberger, John W. (December 1897). "The Vegetation of Yellowstone Hot Springs". American Journal of Pharmacy. 69 (12).
- MacDougall, W. B.; Baggley, Herma A. (1936). Plants of Yellowstone National Park. U.S. Department of the Interior.
- Rydberg, Per Axel PhD (1900). Catalogue of the flora of Montana and the Yellowstone National Park (PDF). New York: New York Botanical Garden.
- Shaw, Richard J. (2004). Wildflowers of Grand Teton and Yellowstone National Parks. Helena, MT: Wheelwright Publishing. ISBN 0-9702067-2-0.
- Vizgirdas, Ray S. (2007). A Guide to Plants of Yellowstone and Grand Teton National Parks. Salt Lake City: University of Utah Press. ISBN 978-0-87480-875-9.

== Geology and geothermal features ==
The following references are primarily focused on the geology and geothermal features within the park.

- Bauer, Clyde Max (1937). The Story of Yellowstone Geysers. Saint Paul, Minnesota: Jack Ellis Haynes.
- Hague, Arthur (1920). Geological History of the Yellowstone National Park (PDF). Washington, D.C.: National Park Service.
- Howard, Arthur David (November 1937). History of The Grand Canyon of the Yellowstone. Geological Society of America, Special Papers Number 6.
- Harris, Ann G. (1998). Geology of National Parks (5 ed.). Iowa, Kendall/Hunt Publishing. ISBN 0-7872-5353-7.
- "The Yellowstone magmatic system from the mantle plume to the upper crust (46,000 km3 magma reservoir below chamber)". Science Magazine. April 2015. doi:10.1126/science.aaa5648.
- Weed, William H. (1912). Geysers (PDF). Government Printing Office.
- Whittlesey, Lee H.; Rubinstein, Paul; Stevens, Mike (2000). The Guide to Yellowstone Waterfalls and Their Discovery. Englewood, Colorado: Westcliffe Publishers. ISBN 156579351X.

== History ==
The following references are primarily focused on the exploration, creation and history of the park.

- Augspurger, Marie M. (1948). Yellowstone National Park-Historical and Descriptive. Naegele-Auer Printing Co.
- Black, George (2012). Empire of Shadows-The Epic Story of Yellowstone. New York: St. Martin's Press. ISBN 978-0312383190.
- Chapple, Janet (2016). Through Early Yellowstone: Adventuring by Bicycle, Covered Wagon, Foot, Horseback, and Skis. Lake Forest Park, WA: Granite Peak Publications. ISBN 978-0-985818265.
- Chittenden, Hiram Martin (1918). The Yellowstone Park-Historical and Descriptive. Cincinnati, Ohio: Stewart and Kidd Company Publishers.
- Cook, Charles W.; Folsom, Dave E.; Peterson, William (1965). Haines, Aubrey L. (ed.). The Valley of the Upper Yellowstone-An Exploration of the Headwaters of the Yellowstone River in the Year 1869. Norman, OK: University of Oklahoma Press.
- Cook, Charles W. (July 1870). "The Valley of the Upper Yellowstone". Western Monthly Magazine. IV: 60–67.
- Crampton, Louis C. (1932). Early History of Yellowstone National Park and Its Relation to National Park Policies (PDF). Washington D.C.: U.S. Department of the Interior. Archived from the original (PDF) on July 2, 2007.
- Culpin, Mary Shivers (1994). The History of the Construction of the Road System of Yellowstone National Park 1872-1966 (Report). National Park Service. Archived from the original on June 29, 2007.
- Culpin, Mary Shivers (2003). For the Benefit and Enjoyment of the People: A History of Concession Development in Yellowstone National Park-1872-1966. Yellowstone National Park, WY: Yellowstone Center for Resources. Archived from the original on August 9, 2007.
- Davis, Jack; Davis, Susan (2013). The Haynes Family in Yellowstone National Park 1881-1968. Bozeman, MT: Olde America Antiques. ISBN 978-0-615-80467-5.
- Everts, Truman C. (November 1871). "Thirty-seven Days of Peril". Scribner's Monthly. III (1).,
- Farrell, Justin. The Battle for Yellowstone: Morality and the Sacred Roots of Environmental Conflict (Princeton University Press, 2015).
- Ferdinand Vandeveer Hayden and the Founding of the Yellowstone National Park. Washington, D.C.: United States Department of the Interior Geological Survey, U.S. Government Printing Office. 1973.
- Haines, Aubrey L. (1996). Yellowstone Place Names-Mirrors of History. Niwot, Colorado: University of Colorado Press. ISBN 0-87081-383-8.
- Haines, Aubrey L. (1977). The Yellowstone Story-A History of Our First National Park. Yellowstone National Park, WY: Yellowstone Library and Museum Association. ISBN 9780870811036.
  - Haines, Aubrey L. (1996). The Yellowstone Story-A History of Our First National Park. Vol. I (Second Revised ed.). Niwot, CO: University Press of Colorado. ISBN 0-87081-391-9.
  - Haines, Aubrey L. (1996). The Yellowstone Story-A History of Our First National Park. Vol. II (Second Revised ed.). Niwot, CO: University Press of Colorado. ISBN 0-87081-391-9.
- Haines, Aubrey L. (1996). Yellowstone Place Names-Mirrors of History. Niwot, Colorado: University of Colorado Press. ISBN 0-87081-383-8.
- Hartley, Robert E. (2007). Saving Yellowstone-The President Arthur Expedition of 1883. Westminster, CO: Sniktau Publications. ISBN 978-1-4257-7121-8.
- Hayden, F.V. (February 1872). "More about the Yellowstone". Scribner's Monthly. III (4): 388–396.
- Hayden, F. V. (1880). The Great West: Its Attractions and Resources, Containing a Popular Description of the Marvelous Scenery, Physical Geography, Fossils and Glaciers of the Wonderful Region, And the Recent Explorations of the Yellowstone Park, "The Wonderland of America". Bloomington, IL: Charles R. Brodix.
- Hedges, Cornelius (1904). "Journal of Judge Cornelius Hedges, Member of the "Washburn Expedition of 1870"". Contributions to the Historical Society of Montana. V: 370–394.
- Henderson, G. L. (1891). Yellowstone National Park, Past, Present and Future. Washington, D.C.: Gibson Brothers.
- Langford, Nathaniel P. (May–June 1871). "The Wonders of the Yellowstone". Scribner's Monthly. II (1–2).
- Langford, Nathaniel P. (1904). "Preface to The Folsom Cook Exploration of the Upper Yellowstone, 1869 (1894)". Contributions to the Historical Society of Montana. V: 354–55.
- Langford, Nathaniel P. (1905). The Discovery of Yellowstone Park--Diary of the Washburn Expedition to the Yellowstone and Firehole Rivers in the Year 1870. St Paul, MN: Frank Jay Haynes.
- Magoc, Chris J. (1999). Yellowstone-The Creation and Selling of An American Landscape, 1870-1903. Albuquerque, NM: University of New Mexico Press. ISBN 0-8263-2119-4.
- Merrill, Marlene Deahl, ed. (1999). Yellowstone and the Great West-Journals, Letters and Images from the 1871 Hayden Expedition. Lincoln, NE: University of Nebraska Press. ISBN 0-8032-3148-2.
- O'Brien, Bob R. (September 1966). "The Future Road System of Yellowstone National Park". Annals of the Association of American Geographers. 56 (3): 385–407. doi:10.1111/j.1467-8306.1966.tb00568.x.
- Peale, Albert C. (June–October 1871). "The Yellowstone (various subtitles)". Philadelphia Press.
- Pritchard, James A. (1999). Preserving Yellowstone's natural conditions : science and the perception of nature. Lincoln, NE: University of Nebraska Press. ISBN 978-0803237223.
- Reeves, Thomas C. (Summer 1969). "President Arthur in Yellowstone National Park". Montana: The Magazine of Western History. 19 (3). Montana Historical Society: 18–29.
- Schullery, Paul; Whittlesey, Lee (2003). Myth and History in the Creation of Yellowstone National Park. Lincoln, NE: University of Nebraska Press. ISBN 0-8032-4305-7.
- Schullery, Paul (1979). Old Yellowstone Days. Boulder, Colorado: Associated University Press. ISBN 0870811215.
- Schullery, Paul (1995). Yellowstone's Ski Pioneers-Peril and Heroism on the Winter Trail. Worland, WY: High Plains Publishing. ISBN 1-881019-10-1.
- Schwatka, Frederick; Hyde, John (1886). Through Wonderland with Lieutenant Schwatka. St. Paul, MN: Northern Pacific Railroad.
- Scott, Kim Allen (Winter 1999). "A Missing Piece of the a Yellowstone Puzzle--The Tangled Provenance of the Cook-Folsom-Peterson Yellowstone Expedition Diary". Yellowstone Science. 7 (1): 12–16.
- Topping, E. S. (1888). The Chronicles of the Yellowstone. St Paul, MN: Pioneer Press Co.
- Vinton, Stallo (1926). John Colter-Discoverer of Yellowstone Park. New York: Edward Iberstadt.
- Watry, Elizabeth A. (2012). Women in Wonderland-Lives, Legends and Legacies of Yellowstone National Park. Helena, MT: Riverbend Publishing. ISBN 978-1-60639-029-0.
- Whittlesey, Lee H. (2006). Yellowstone Place Names. Gardiner, MT: Wonderland Publishing Company. ISBN 1-59971-716-6.
- Whittlesey, Lee H. (1995). Death in Yellowstone-Accidents and Foolhardiness in the First National Park. Lanham, MD: Robert Rinehart Publishers. ISBN 1570980217.

== Management ==
The following references are primarily focused on issues of park management by the U.S. Army and the National Park Service.

- Bartlett, Richard (1985). Yellowstone: A Wilderness Besieged. Tucson, AZ: University of Arizona Press. ISBN 0-8165-1098-9.
- Chase, Alston (1986). Playing God in Yellowstone-The Destruction of America's First National Park. Boston, MA: The Atlantic Monthly Press. ISBN 0-87113-025-4.
- Everhart, Bill (1998). Take Down The Flag & Feed The Horses. Chicago, IL: University of Illinois Press. ISBN 0-252-02379-X.
- Hampton, H. Duane (1972). How the U.S. Cavalry Saved Our National Parks. Bloomington, IN: Indiana University Press. ISBN 025313885X.
- Lewis, H. H. (August 1903). "Managing a national park-How The Yellowstone Park is Administered By the Government". Outlook. 74.
- Meyer, Judith L. (1996). The Spirit of Yellowstone--The Cultural Evolution of a National Park. Boulder, Colorado: Rowman and Littlefield.
- Rydell, Kiki Leigh; Culpin, Mary Shivers (2006). Managing the Matchless Wonders-History of Administrative Development in Yellowstone National Park, 1872-1965 (Report). National Park Service, Yellowstone Center for Resources. YCR-CR-2006-03. Archived from the original on January 7, 2013.
- Schullery, Paul (1995). Mountain Time: A Yellowstone Memoir. Boulder, Colorado: Roberts Rinehart Publishers. ISBN 0-8052-3932-4.
- Schullery, Paul (1997). Searching for Yellowstone: Ecology and Wonder in the Last Wilderness. Boston: Houghton Mifflin Co. ISBN 0-395-84174-7.
- Sellars, Richard West (1999). Preserving Nature in the National Parks-A History. Yale University Press. ISBN 9780300075786. Archived from the original on July 4, 2007.
- Watry, Elizabeth A.; Whittlesey, Lee H. (2012). Fort Yellowstone. Charleston, SC: Arcadia Publishing. ISBN 9780738593142.

== Native Americans in Yellowstone National Park ==
The following references are primarily focused on the history of Native Americans within the park.

- Beal, Merrill D. (1949). The Story of Man in Yellowstone. Caldwell, ID: Caxton Printers.
- Janetski, Joel C. (1987). Indians in Yellowstone National Park. Salt Lake City, Utah: University of Utah Press. ISBN 0-87480-724-7.
- Lahren, Larry (2006). Homeland: An archaeologist's view of Yellowstone Country's past. Cayuse Press. p. 161. ISBN 0-9789251-0-6.
- Magoc, Chris J. (1999). "Works Cited-Secondary Sources: Books, Articles and Dissertations". Yellowstone-The Creation and Selling of An American Landscape, 1870-1903. Albuquerque, NM: University of New Mexico Press. pp. 235–244. ISBN 0-8263-2119-4.
- Nabokov, Peter; Loendorf, Lawrence (2000). American Indians in Yellowstone National Park-A Documentary Overview (PDF). National Park Service. Archived from the original (PDF) on July 3, 2007.
- "Yellowstone National Park". National Park Service, Park histories. Archived from the original on June 17, 2007.
- Schullery, Paul, ed. (2004). "People and Place-The Human Experience in Greater Yellowstone". Proceedings 4th Biennial Scientific Conference on the Greater Yellowstone Ecosystem March 1997. Yellowstone National Park: National Park Service.
- Whittlesey, Lee H. (1995). "Bibliography". Death in Yellowstone-Accidents and Foolhardiness in the First National Park. Lanham, MD: Roberts Rineharts Publisher. pp. 247–259. ISBN 1-57098-021-7.

== Online bibliographies ==
- "Greater Yellowstone Bibliography". University of Wyoming Libraries. Archived from the original on 2010-06-21.
- "Yellowstone Park Science Bibliographic Database". Washington State University. Archived from the original on 2010-07-02.

== Sociology ==
- Farrell, Justin (2015). The Battle for Yellowstone. Princeton, NJ: Princeton University Press. ISBN 978-0691164342.

== Tourism and recreation ==
The following references are primarily related to promoting tourism and recreational opportunities in the park, to include memoirs and recollections of prominent tourist experiences.

- Biddulph, Stephan P. (2013). Five Old Men-The Rise of Interpretation in the First National Park. Salt Lake City: University of Utah Press. ISBN 9781607812579.
- Campbell, Reau (1909). Campbells New Revised Complete Guide and Descriptive Book of the Yellowstone Park. Chicago, IL: H. E. Klamer.
- Chapple, Janet (2016). Through Early Yellowstone: Adventuring by Bicycle, Covered Wagon, Foot, Horseback, and Skis. Lake Forest Park, WA: Granite Peak Publications. ISBN 978-0-985818265.
- Clawson, Calvin C. (2003). Silliman, Eugene Lee (ed.). A Ride to the Infernal Regions--Yellowstone's First Tourists. Helena, Montana: Riverbend Publishing. ISBN 1-931832-18-8.
- Eldridge, M. O. (November 1910). "Touring Yellowstone park on government highways". World Today. 19.
- Elliot, L. Louise (1913). Six Weeks on Horseback Through Yellowstone Park. Rapid City, ND: Privately printed.
- Guptill, Albert Brewer (1894). Yellowstone Park Guide-A Practical Handbook. St Paul, MN: Frank J. Haynes.
- Haynes, F. Jay (1890). Haynes Guide-Yellowstone National Park. St Paul, MN: F. Jay Haynes.
  - The Haynes Guide was published annually and continually until 1966, first by F. Jay Haynes and then by his son Jack Ellis Haynes
- Quick, Herbert (1911). Yellowstone Nights (PDF). Indianapolis, IN: Bobbs-Merrill.
- Stanley, Erwin James (1878). Rambles in Wonderland, or Up the Yellowstone and Among the Geysers and other Curiosities of the National Park (PDF). New York: D. Appleton and Co.
- Strong, W.E. (1876). A Trip To Yellowstone National Park in 1875. Government Printing Office.
- Turrill, Gardner S. (1901). A tale of the Yellowstone, or, In a Wagon through Wyoming and Wonderland. Jefferson, IA: Privately printed.
- Waite, Thornton (2006). Yellowstone by Train-A History of Rail Travel to America's First National Park. Missoula, MT: Pictorial Histories Publishing Inc. ISBN 978-1-57510-129-3.
- Whittlesey, Lee H. (1995). Death in Yellowstone-Accidents and Foolhardiness in the First National Park. Lanham, MD: Roberts Rineharts Publisher. ISBN 1-57098-021-7.
- Whittlesey, Lee H. (2007). Storytelling in Yellowstone-Horse and Buggy Tour Guides. Albuquerque, NM: University of New Mexico Press. ISBN 978-0-8263-4117-4.
- Whittlesey, Lee H.; Watry, Elizabeth A. (2009). Ho! For Wonderland-Travelers' Accounts of Yellowstone, 1872-1914. Abequerque, NM: University of New Mexico Press. ISBN 978-0-8263-4616-2.
