= Bibliography of fly fishing =

List of English language works on the sport of fly fishing

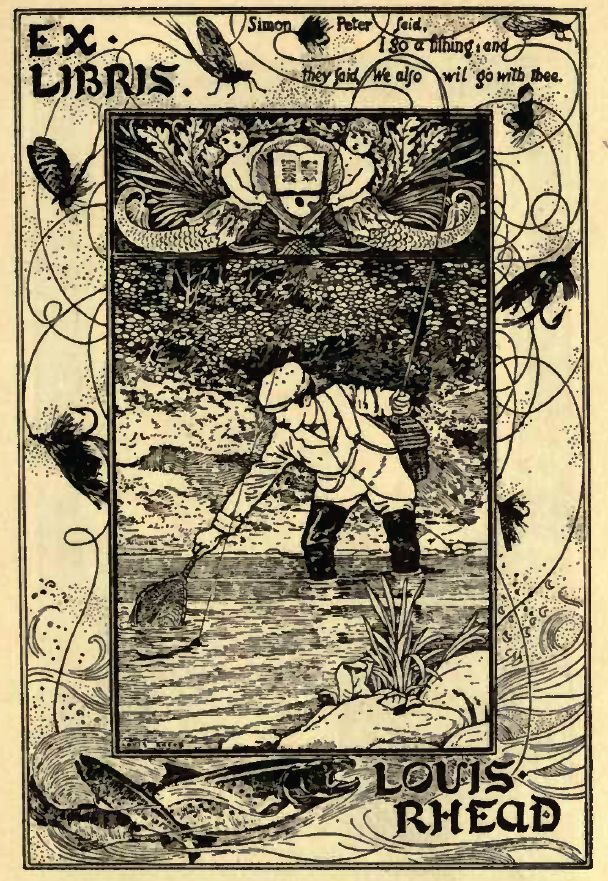
Fly fishing book plate from Louis Rhead (1907)

This general annotated bibliography page provides an overview of notable and not so notable works in the English language regarding the sport of fly fishing, listed by year of first publication. Although not all the listed books are devoted exclusively to fly fishing, all these titles contain significant fly fishing content. The focus of the present page is on classic general texts on fly fishing and its history, together with notable public or university library collections dedicated to fly fishing.

- For readability, the bibliography is contained in three separate lists. For books primarily dedicated to fly tying, fly tackle, regional guides, memoirs, stories and fly fishing fiction see: Bibliography of fly fishing (fly tying, stories, fiction).
- For species related fly fishing literature see: Bibliography of fly fishing (species related).

== Annotations ==
Annotations may reflect descriptive comments from the book's dust jacket, third party reviews or personal, descriptive and qualitative comments by individuals who have read the book. Some older works have links to online versions in the Internet Archive or Google Books.

== Notable fly-fishing library collections ==
- The Western Washington University Fly Fishing Collection, Bellingham, Washington

Western Libraries holds an extensive collection of printed materials on the history and literature of fly fishing. Numbering more than 2,500 titles and dating back to the origin of the genre in seventeenth-century England, the materials support the study of not only the development of this sport, but also its relationship to nature writing, art, ecology, conservation, and even the history of printing and publishing. The collection includes books, periodicals, manuscripts, photographs, artworks, oral histories, and fly fishing artifacts.

- Kienbusch Angling Collection, Princeton University Library, Princeton, New Jersey

The Kienbusch Collection at Princeton University contains some of the most extraordinary gems in the history of angling literature. There are about 1500 books and manuscripts in all, representing the collective wisdom of five centuries of angling writers, from Berners to Bergman and beyond ....

- The Kenneth H. Rockey Angling Collection, Princeton University Library
- The Daniel B. Fearing Collection, Houghton Library, Harvard University

... the Daniel B. Fearing collection, one of the largest and most important (if also little known) pools of texts, manuscripts and journalson angling, fish culture, fisheries and whaling logs in the world.

— Darin S. Kinsey, An Angler's Literary Paradise (2007)

- The LaFontaine Angling Collection, University of Wyoming's American Heritage Center, Rare Book Collection, Laramie, Wyoming. Library website
- Frederick and Clara Toppan Angling Book Collection, University of Wyoming's American Heritage Center, Rare Book Collection. Library website
- American Museum of Fly Fishing, Manchester, Vermont, The museum's library ranks as one of the largest public collections of fly-fishing books in America. Museum website
- The Reed Draper Collection of Angling Books, Clarke Historical Library, Central Michigan University, Mount Pleasant, Michigan
- Harry Hawthorn Foundation Collection, University of British Columbia, Vancouver, British Columbia

The Library of the University of British Columbia has an excellent collection of books on angling and fly-fishing, known as the Harry Hawthorn Collection. At present it totals more than 2200 books, including many rare and valuable items. This Collection came about as the result of a fishing holiday in 1953 by eight UBC professors and Roderick Haig-Brown at Upper Campbell Lake.

- Milne Angling Collection, University of New Hampshire Library, Durham, New Hampshire

The Milne Angling Collection includes a large number of volumes that represent the very beginnings of angling literature. Dame Juliana Berners' A Treatyse of Fysshynge wyth an Angle (1496) is considered the first book on the subject printed in England. Although some question her authorship, Berners, who was prioress of the Benedictine abbey of Sopwell, occupies a similar place in angling literature to that accorded Chaucer in English literature. The Milne Collection contains several editions of Berners' work dating from the 1827 William Pickering edition to modern versions, such as the one published in John McDonald's Quill Gordon (1972).

- George Harvey Fly-Fishing Literature Collection, Penn State University Life Sciences Library, State College, Pennsylvania
- Trout & Salmonid Collection at Montana State University, Montana State University, Bozeman, Montana

Since our beginnings in the late Nineteenth Century, the MSU Libraries has striven to develop a world–class research collection in support of the academic goals of our university, including those of local interest with national and international resonance. Sixty years of research on fish and fisheries has given MSU a strong tradition on which to build the nation's preeminent trout and salmonid collection. Not only does the collection support this world–class research, but it is a focal point of local and regional pride for those who care about the salmonid species’ well being and about the waters that flow through this region. Housed in the MSU Libraries’ Merrill G. Burlingame Special Collections, this collection is open to the public for use on the premises in a controlled archival environment.

  - Contains the following notable collections:
    - Strung, Norman (Literary manuscripts and correspondence, 1966–1982)
    - Pellicane, Alfred T. (Papers, 1962–2000)
    - Mitchell, Harry B. (Papers, 1953–1965)
    - Agassiz, Louis (Letters, 1854–1858)
    - Salmon Poisoning Research Collection (Papers, 1923–1999)
    - Nick Lyons Ephemera Collection (Corporate records and personal papers, 1932–2005)
    - Behnke, Robert J. (Papers, 1957–2000)
- Angling Oral History Collection

== 15th-century texts ==
- Berners, Dame Juliana (1496). A Treatise of Fysshynge with An Angle (PDF). London: Wynkyn De Worde.

Although it was once regarded as the source from which all later works on fly fishing sprang, the Treatyse can now, more correctly, be regarded as a British text on fly fishing which happens to have survived, although its status as the earliest English printed book on fishing means that it remains hugely influential.

— Dr. Andrew Herd, The Fly, 2001

== 17th-century texts ==
- Dennys, John (1652). The Secrets of Angling. London: John Harrison. The Secrets of Angling contains the first known illustration of an artificial fly. Denny's book was reprinted extensively in the 19th century.
- Walton, Izaak (1653). The Compleat Angler. London. Izaak Walton did not profess to be an expert with the fly; the fly fishing in his first edition was contributed by Thomas Barker, a retired cook and humorist, who produced a treatise of his own in 1659. In the last edition a second part was added by his friend Charles Cotton, who took up Venator where Walton had left him and completed his instruction in fly fishing and the making of flies.
- Venables, Colonel Robert (1662). The Experienced Angler or Angling Improved. London: Richard Marriott. Extensively cited in Herd's The Fly, Venables work provides great insight into the fly tackle and techniques being used in the 17th century

== 18th-century texts ==
- Brookes, Richard M.D. (1766). The Art of Angling in Two Parts – Comprising all that is curious and valuable in the Art of Angling. London: T. Lowndes. Online Version (7th Edition – 1790), the Brookes text, which went through seven editions in the late 18th century, are extremely important in closing the gap of knowledge about fly fishing from the time of Walton to the early 19th century. Brookes is also the first to make written references to fly fishing in saltwater.
- Best, Thomas (1787). A Concise Treatise on the Art of Angling. London: B. Crosby & Co. this work first appeared in 1787 and ran through 13 editions.

He makes mention of the multiplying reel, the first time we hear of it, but evidently not unknown before his day. In the second part of the book, which has the special title The Complete Fly-fisher, he describes the dressing of many flies and their killing powers. Upon the whole, it is a practical and sensible work.

— James Robb, Notable Angling Literature, 1945

== 19th-century texts ==
- Taylor, Samuel (1800). Angling in All Its Branches. London: T. M. Longman and O'Kees. Angling in All Its Branches was one of the first works to address Fly fishing for Salmon and tying salmon flies. Taylor was the first fly fishing author to mention the use of a fly tying vice.
- Bainbrige, George Cole (1811). The Fly-fishers Guide. London: Longman, Orme, Brown, Green & Longman. Bainbridge was one of the first authors to use color plates and The Fly Fisher's Guide contains numerous plates showing fly patterns, materials and tying techniques.
- The North Country Angler; or the Art of Angling as practiced in the Northern Counties of England. London: Longman, Hurst, Rees, Orme & Brown. 1817.
- Rennie, James (1833). Alphabet of Scientific Angling for use of Beginners (PDF). London: William Orr. Dr. Andrew Herd credits Rennie with being the first author to describe the complicated methods of producing fly hooks in the 19th century.
- Turton, John (1836). The Angler's Manual; or Fly-fisher's Oracle (PDF). London: R. Groombridge.
- Ronalds, Alfred (1836). The Fly Fisher's Entomology (PDF). London: Longman, Orme, Brown, Green and Longmans. this 231 page, well illustrated treatment of British stream insects of importance to the trout and grayling angler laid the foundation for the detailed works on artificial fly imitation theory that followed for the next 100 years, see also The Fly-fisher's Entomology and Alfred Ronalds.
- Kirkbride, John (1837). The Northern Angler; or Fly-Fisher's Companion (PDF). Carlisle, Scotland: C. Turhham.
- Wallwork, James (1847). The Modern Angler – Comprising Angling in all Its Branches. Manchester, England: James Cheltenham.
- Hutchinson, Horace. G. (1851). Fly-Fishing in Salt and Freshwater (PDF). London: John Van Voorst.
- Akerman, John Yonge (1852). Spring Tide; or the Angler and his Friends (PDF). London: Richard Bentley.
- Bowlker, Charles (1854). Bowlker's Art of Angling – Containing Directions for Fly-fishing, Trolling, Making Artificial Flies, etc (PDF). London: Longman, Brown & Co. The Art of Angling was in print for over 100 years in 16 editions from 1747 to 1854

As John Waller Hills says in Fly Fishing for Trout, "Its excellence lies in three features: the directions for fly fishing including one of the early recommendations of upstream fishing, the directions for fly dressing, and the knowledge shewn of the life of the natural fly, which is in advance of anything that had appeared before"

— Sylvester Nemes, 2004.

- Cartwright, William (Clericus) (1854). Rambles and Recollections of a Fly-fisher – Illustrated with an appendix contai'ning ample instrucitions to the novice inclusive of fly-making, and a list of really useful flies (PDF). London: Chapman and Hall.
- Stewart, W. C. (1857). The Practical Angler; or the Art of Trout-Fishing. Edinburgh: Adam and Charles Black. Online Version (1st Edition); Online Version (5th Edition, 1867); Online Version (8th Edition, 1883); Online Version (1907 Edition)
- Herbert, Henry William (1859). Frank Forrester's Fish and Fishing of the United States and British Provinces of North America (PDF). New York: Geo. E. Woodward. Frank Forrester, the pseudonym for English born Henry William Herbet was one of the most popular sporting writers before the Civil War. He popularized Hunting and Fishing with commercially successful sporting books such as this one.
- Wade, Henry (1860). Rod Fishing in Clear Waters by Fly, Minnow and Worm – With and Short and Easy Method for the Art of Dressing Flies (PDF). London: Bell and Daldy.
- Norris, Thaddeus (1864). The American Angler's Book: Embracing The Natural History of Sporting Fish, and The Art Of Taking Them. With Instructions In Fly-Fishing, Fly-Making, And Rod-Making; and Directions For Fish-Breeding (PDF). Philadelphia: E. H. Butler and Co.

Thaddeus Norris, who Arnold Gingrich called the American Walton, is widely regarded as the most important American angling author of the nineteenth century. His American Angler's Book, first published in 1864, lasted far longer that most modern fishing books seem to, and was a monument of practical instruction

— Paul Schullery, The American Fly Fisher, 1980.

- Otter (1864). The Modern Angler – Containing instructions on the Art of Fly-fishing, Spinning and Bottom-fishing (PDF). London: Alfred & Son. Otter was a pseudonym for H. J. Alfred of London.
- Roosevelt, Robert Barnwell (1865). Superior Fishing; or The Striped Bass, Trout and Black Bass of the Northern States (PDF). New York: Carelton Publishers.
- Fitzgibbon, Edward (1865). A Handbook of Angling teaching Fly-fishing, trolling, bottom-fishing and Salmon-fishing (PDF). London: Longmans, Green & Co.
- Burgess, J. T. (1867). Angling: A Practical Guide to Bottom-fishing, Trolling and Fly-fishing (PDF). London: Frederick Warne & Co.
- Francis, Francis (1867). A Book on Angling. London: Longmans, Green and Company.
- Scott, Genio C. (1869). Fishing in American Waters (PDF). New York: Harper & Brothers, Publishers.
- Hallock, Charles (1873). The Fishing Tourist. New York: Harper & Brothers.
- Brown, John J. (1876). The American Angler's Guide (PDF). New York: D. Appleton & Company.
- Roosevelt, Robert Barnwell (1884). Superior Fishing; or The Striped Bass, Trout, Black Bass and Bluefish of the Northern States (PDF). New York: Orange Judd.
- Orvis, Charles F.; Cheney, A. Nelson (1885). Fishing With The Fly (PDF). Troy, NY: H. B. Nims & Co.
- Halford, Frederick M. (1886). Floating Flies and How to Dress Them. A Treatise on the Most Modern Methods of Dressing Artificial Flies for Trout and Grayling with Full Illustrated Directions and Containing Ninety Hand-Coloured Engravings of the Most Killing Patterns Together with a Few Hints to Dry-Fly Fishermen (PDF). London: Sampson, Low, Marston, Searle, and Rivington. this was Halford's first book, and it launched the opening salvo in the decades long battle pitting fly fishers favoring the floating fly against those endorsing the sunk fly, an argument which today seems as appropriate as the house cook slipping on boxing gloves in preparation to picking out fly droppings from the black pepper. Nine color plates of hand colored flies. One color chart. Text illustrations. Six 19th century American fly patterns laid in. 136 pp. including index, see also Floating Flies and How to Dress Them.
- Keene, J. Harrington (1887). Fly Fishing and Fly Making for Trout (PDF). New York: O. Judd & Co.
- Halford, Frederick M (1889). Dry-Fly Fishing in Theory and Practice. London: Sampson Low, Marston, Searle, and Rivington.
- Mabury, Mary Orvis (1892). Favorite Flies and Their Histories. Boston and New York: Houghton, Mifflin and Co.
- Taylor, J. Paul (1898). Fishing and Fishers (PDF). London: Ward, Lock and Company, Limited.
- Grey of Fallodon, Viscount (1899). Fly Fishing (PDF). London: The Temple Press. a readable but comprehensive discussion of wet fly, dry fly, sea-trout and salmon fly fishing written in an easy, story-telling style. See also Fly Fishing (Grey book) An angling classic

== Fly-fishing history, bibliographies and literature reviews ==
=== 19th century ===
- Blakey, Robert (1856). Historical Sketches of the Angling Literature of All Nations – To which is added A Bibliography of English Writers on Angling (PDF). London: John Russell Smith.

His history is suspect, at best. Westwood and Sachell, in their milestone Bibliotheca Piscatoria (1883), give the following opinions of Historical Sketches: "A slip-shod and negligent work, devoid of all real utility. A mere farrago of matter relevant and irrelevant, of indiscriminate sweepings from miscellaneous sources, of quotations incorrectly given and of so-called original passages the vaqueness and uncertainty of which rob them of all weight and value. Names and dates are seldom given, or are inaccurately...." They go on to catalog a few of the grosser errors and conclude that the book's only value is in its excellent bibliography, which, as we will see, also has its problems.

— Paul Schullery, The American Fly Fisher, 1985.

- Smith, John Russell (1861). A Bibliographical Catalogue of English Writers on Angling and Ichthyology. London: Tucker & Company.
- Westwood, T.; Satchell, T (1883). Bibliotheca Piscatoria – A Catalogue of Books on Angling, The Fisheries and Fish Culture with citations touching on angling and fishing from old English authors (PDF). Covent Garden, London: W. Satchell.
- Albee, Louise Rankin (1896). Justin Winsor (ed.). The Bartlett Collection – A List of Books on Angling, Fishes and Fish Culture in Harvard University Library. Cambridge, Miss.: Harvard University Library.

=== 20th century ===
- Hills, John Waller (1921). A History of Fly Fishing for Trout (PDF). London: Phillp Allan & Co. Dr. Andrew Herd credits Hill with the first attempt to codify the history of fly fishing, albeit Hill's work shows a distinctly British bias and disregard for other European influences. See also A History of Fly Fishing for Trout
- Radcliffe, William (1921). Fishing From the Earliest Times (PDF). London: John Murray.
- Goodspeed, Charles E. (1939). Angling in America – Its Early History and Literature. Boston: Houghton Mifflin Company.
- Robb, James (1945). Notable Angling Literature. London: Herbert Jenkins Limited.
- Starkman, Susan B.; Read, Stanley E. (1970). The Contemplative Man's Recreation: A Bibliography of Books on Angling and Game Fish in the Library of The University of British Columbia. Vancouver, British Columbia, Canada: The Library of the University of British Columbia. contains a Chronological Appendix Indicating Landmarks in the Evolution of Angling Literature and Some Prefatory Matters Pertaining to the History of The Harry Hawthorn Foundation for the Inculcation and Propagation of the Principles and Ethics of Fly-Fishing. Contains illustrations.
- McDonald, John (1972). Quill Gordon. New York: Alfred A. Knopf. ISBN 0394469895.
- Gingrich, Arnold (1973). The Joys of Trout. New York: Crown Publishers, Inc. ISBN 0517505843. listed as one of the modern "classics" of angling in the University of New Hampshire Library Milne Angling Collection
- Gingrich, Arnold (1974). The Fishing In Print – A Guided Tour Through Five Centuries of Angling Literature. New York: Winchester Press. Gingrich, the well known founding editor of Esquire magazine surveys the major pieces of classic and modern fly fishing literature up through the 1950s. It is an excellent read to get a better understanding of the evolution of the various styles of fly fishing—wet, nymphs, dry, etc. as originally written about by the likes of Halford, Skues, Gordon and Jennings along with many others.

Arnold Gingrich, founding editor of Esquire magazine, is a tremendous part of the literary history of fly fishing. The Fishing In Print, The Joys of Trout, and The Well-Tempered Angler are indispensable titles to the well-read fly fisherman of today.

— Glenn Law, A Concise History of Fly Fishing, 1995.

- Waterman, Charles F. (1981). A History of Angling. Tulsa, Oklahoma: Winchester Press. ISBN 0876913435.
- Sheets, K. A. (1993). American Fishing Books – A Guide to Values. Ann Arbor, MI: Anglers and Scholars. an alphabetical, by author, list of over 2000 titles of American published fishing books with values for collectable copies estimated by the author.
- Schullery, Paul (1996). American Fly Fishing – A History. Norwalk, CT: The Easton Press. sponsored by the American Museum of Fly Fishing, Manchester, CT, when Paul Schullery was the managing director, Fly Fishing – A History is probably the most contemporary and complete treatise on the evolution of fly fishing as it is known today.
- Schwiebert, Ernest (1998). The Henryville Flyfishers – A Chronicle of American Fly Fishing. Far Hills, N.J.: Meadow Run Press. ISBN 1886967083. a notable account by Ernest Schwiebert and one of the seminal books on American Fly Fishing clubs.
- Schullery, Paul (1999). Royal Coachman – The Lore and Legends of Fly-Fishing. New York: Simon and Schuster. ISBN 0684842467. while giving due respect to the elders of Fly-Fishing history, Schullery celebrates some lesser-known fisherman and some seldom-appreciated waters, such as the limestone streams of Pennsylvania. He muses on the pursuit of the ever-more perfectly "natural" fly and contrasts that quest with the storied success of the Royal Coachman, perhaps the gaudiest fly ever invented.
- Bark, Conrad Vos (1996). The Dry Fly – Progress Since Halford. Ludlow, UK: Merlin Unwin Books. ISBN 1873674228.

=== 21st century ===
- Herd, Andrew Dr (2001). The Fly. Ellesmere, Shropshire: Medlar Press. ISBN 1899600191.
- Nemes, Sylvester (2004). Two centuries of soft-hackled flies – A survey of literature complete with original patterns. Mechanicsburg, Pennsylvania: Stackpole Books. ISBN 0811700488.
- Schullery, Paul (2008). If Fish Could Scream – An Angler's Search For The Future of Fly Fishing. Mechanicsburg, Pennsylvania: Stackpole Books. ISBN 978-0811704359.

In seven essays sometimes controversial, sometimes reflective, all fascinating, Paul Schullery ruminates on the evolution of fly fishing and delves into the big issues affecting the world of fly fishing today and tomorrow. Dams’ effect on fishing, the supposed cruelty of catch-and-release, competition among fly fishers, spinning versus fly fishing, and how transportation has changed the sport are just a few of the topics he covers.

— The Fireside Angler.

- Greenhalgh, Malcolm; Jason Smalley (2009). Fishing Flies: A World Encyclopedia of Every Type of Fly. London: Harper Collins Publishers. ISBN 978-0007288458.
- Black, William C. (2010). Gentlemen Preferred Dry Flies – The Dry Fly and The Nymph, Evolution and Conflict. Albuquerque, N.M.: University of New Mexico Press. ISBN 978-0826347954.
- Whitelaw, Ian (2015). The History of Fly-Fishing in Fifty Flies. New York: Stewart, Tabori and Chang. ISBN 978-1617691461.

== Biographies ==
- Day, Frank Parker (1927). The Autobiography of a Fisherman. Garden City, New York: Doubleday, Page and Company. in 1927, celebrated Canadian author Frank Parker Day wrote his autobiographical reflections on fishing, family, and, more broadly, humanity's place in the natural world. The Autobiography of a Fisherman, a Canadian fly-fishing classic, is a wonderful recollection of one man's life, with characters struggling in a depressed economy, contending with the social pressures of local village life, and responding in one way or the other to the pull of the big city. Day details his early introduction to fishing, which becomes a lifelong passion, at once a 'gentle art' and a 'disease'.
- Benn, Ernest (1977). G. E. M. Skues – The Way of a Man with a Trout. London: Ernest Benn. ISBN 0510225063.
- Sampson, Jack (1995). Lee Wulff. Portland, Oregon: Frank Amato. ISBN 1571880194.
- Robson, Kenneth (1998). The Essential G. E. M. Skues. London: A & C Black. ISBN 155821691X.
- Hilyard, Graydon; Hilyard, Leslie (2000). Carrie G. Stevens, Maker of the Rangeley Favorite Trout and Salmon Flies. Mechanicsburg, PA: Stackpole Books. ISBN 0811703533.
- Hayter, Tony (2002). F.M. Halford and the Dry-Fly Revolution. London: Rober Hale. ISBN 0709067739. the first definitive biography of the father of dry fly fishing, Frederic M. Halford.
- Berryman, Jack W. (2006). Fly-Fishing Pioneers and Legends of the Northwest. Seattle, WA: Northwest Fly Fishing LLC. ISBN 978-0977945405.
- Kreh, Lefty (2008). My Life Was This Big: And Other True Fishing Tales. Skyhorse Publishing. ISBN 978-1602393592. – autobiography of Lefty Kreh
- Lawton, Terry (2010). Marryat – Prince of Fly Fishers. Ellesmere, Shropshire, UK: Medlar Press. ISBN 978-1899600489.
- Herd, Andrew (2010). Angling Giants – Anglers Who Made History. Ellesmere, Shropshire, UK: Medlar Press. ISBN 978-1899600601.
- Freer, Adrian V W (2019). Dr Bell of Wrington: Pioneer of Reservoir Fly Fishing. Leicester, UK: Welford Court Press. ISBN 978-1798530146.

== General fly fishing ==
- Francis, Francis (1920). A Book on Angling Being A Complete Treatise on the Art of Angling in Every Branch (PDF). Philadelphia: J. B. Lippencott. 1st US edition of this 1867 book.
- St John, Larry (1920). Practical Fly Fishing (PDF). New York: MacMillan Company.
- Harris, J. R. (1952). An Angler's Entomology. London: Collins. ISBN 978-0007308187. New Naturalist #23
- Ivens, T. C. (1952). Still Water Fly-Fishing. London: Andre Deutsch. ISBN 978-0233966540. A modern guide to fly fishing in reservoirs and lakes.
- Gingrich, Arnold (1965). The Well Tempered Angler. New York: Alfred A. Knopf. more on the fishing life than how to, but much information about light tackle fly fishing from the founding editor of Esquire. Contains useful bibliographic references to other fly fishing literature.
- Slaymaker II, S. R. (1969). Simplified Fly Fishing. New York: Harper & Row Publishers. a general treatise on the basics of freshwater, warmwater and saltwater fly fishing and tackle.

Sam Slaymaker is a 'complete' a fly fisherman as we have, and despite his profession of simplification, he hasn't held back one iota of his own sophisticated practice of writing in this book

— Arnold Gingrich, The Joys of Trout, 1973

- Latham, Roger; Bashline, James; Chandler, Leon; DuBois, Donald; Elliot, Bob; Green, Larry; Harvey, George; McNally, Tom; Sosin, Mark; Waterman, Charles (1972). There's No Fishing Like Fly Rod Fishing – The Cortland Series. New York: Richard Rosen's Press Inc. ISBN 082390248X. a compendium of articles by top fly fishing experts on the various aspects of freshwater, warmwater and saltwater fly fishing and tackle. Sponsored by the Cortland Line Company.
- Hidy, V. S. Pete (1972). The Pleasures of Fly Fishing. New York: Winchester Press. ISBN 0876910398. a beautiful compilation of vignettes on fly fishing accompanied by excellent photography of fly fishing experiences.
- Migel, Michael J., ed. (1977). The Masters on the Dry Fly. New York: J.B. Lippincott. ISBN 0397011881.
- Kreh, Lefty (1991–1996). Lefty's Little Library of Fly Fishing. Birmingham, Alabama: Odysseus Editions. this is a twenty-five volume set published by Kreh and other authors covers almost every aspect of the sport of fly fishing. Contains the following titles:
  - Kreh, Lefty (1991). Fly Fishing Techniques and Tactics. Birmingham, Alabama: Odysseus Editions.
  - Kreh, Lefty (1991). Modern Fly Casting Method – Mastering the Essential Casts. Birmingham, Alabama: Odysseus Editions.
  - Kreh, Lefty (1991). Lefty's Little Tips – 200 Innovative Ideas For Improving Your Fly Fishing. Birmingham, Alabama: Odysseus Editions.
  - Kreh, Lefty (1992). Fly Fishing For Trout – Volume 1 – Special Techniques. Birmingham, Alabama: Odysseus Editions.
  - Kreh, Lefty (1992). American Masters Fly Fishing Symposium – Part One – Skills. Birmingham, Alabama: Odysseus Editions.
  - Kreh, Lefty (1992). American Masters Fly Fishing Symposium – Part Two – Tackle. Birmingham, Alabama: Odysseus Editions.
  - Kreh, Lefty (1992). Fly Fishing for Bonefish, Permit & Tarpon. Birmingham, Alabama: Odysseus Editions.
  - Kreh, Lefty (1993). American Masters Fly Fishing Symposium – Part Three – The Travel, the Fish, the Life. Birmingham, Alabama: Odysseus Editions.
  - Kreh, Lefty (1993). Professionals' Favorite Flies – Volume 1 – Dry Flies, Emergers, Nymphs & Terrestrials. Birmingham, Alabama: Odysseus Editions.
  - Kreh, Lefty (1993). Fly Fishing for Bass – Smallmouth, Largemouth, Exotics. Birmingham, Alabama: Odysseus Editions.
  - Kreh, Lefty; Middleton, Harry (1993). Lefty's Favorite Fly Fishing Waters – Volume One – United States. Birmingham, Alabama: Odysseus Editions.
  - Kreh, Lefty (1994). Fly Fishing Knots and Connections. Birmingham, Alabama: Odysseus Editions.
  - Kreh, Lefty (1994). Professionals' Favorite Flies – Volume 2 – Streamers, Poppers, Crustaceans and Saltwater Patterns. Birmingham, Alabama: Odysseus Editions.
  - Kreh, Lefty (1994). Advanced Fly Casting. Birmingham, Alabama: Odysseus Editions.
  - Kreh, Lefty (1995). Fly Fishing The Inshore Waters. Birmingham, Alabama: Odysseus Editions.
  - Kreh, Lefty (1996). Lefty's Favorite Fishing Stories & Complete Index. Birmingham, Alabama: Odysseus Editions.
- Goddard, John (1993). Fly Fishing For Trout – Volume 2 – Understanding Trout Behavior. Birmingham, Alabama: Odysseus Editions.
- Tullis, Larry (1993). Fly Fishing For Trout – Volume 3 – Small Fly Techniques. Birmingham, Alabama: Odysseus Editions.
- Whitlock, Dave (1994). Fly Fishing For Trout – Volume 4 – Imitating and Fishing Natural Fish Foods. Birmingham, Alabama: Odysseus Editions.
- Teeny, Jim (1994). The Teeny Technique For Steelhead & Salmon. Birmingham, Alabama: Odysseus Editions.
- Richards, Bruce (1994). Modern Fly Lines. Birmingham, Alabama: Odysseus Editions.
- Hughes, Dave (1995). Fly Fishing For Trout – Volume 5 – Fishing The Four Seasons. Birmingham, Alabama: Odysseus Editions.
- Tullis, Larry (1995). Fly Fishing For Trout – Volume 6 – Nymphing Strategies. Birmingham, Alabama: Odysseus Editions.
- Bitton, Dennis (1995). A Field Guide To Fly Fishing. Birmingham, Alabama: Odysseus Editions.
- Law, Glenn (1995). A Concise History of Fly Fishing. Birmingham, Alabama: Odysseus Editions.
- Merwin, John (2001). Streamer Fly Fishing – A Practical Guide to the Best Patterns and Methods of Fishing the Streamer in Rivers, Lakes and *Salt Water. New York: Lyons Press. ISBN 1585740411.
