= Fly Fishing (Grey book) =

1899 book by Edward Grey

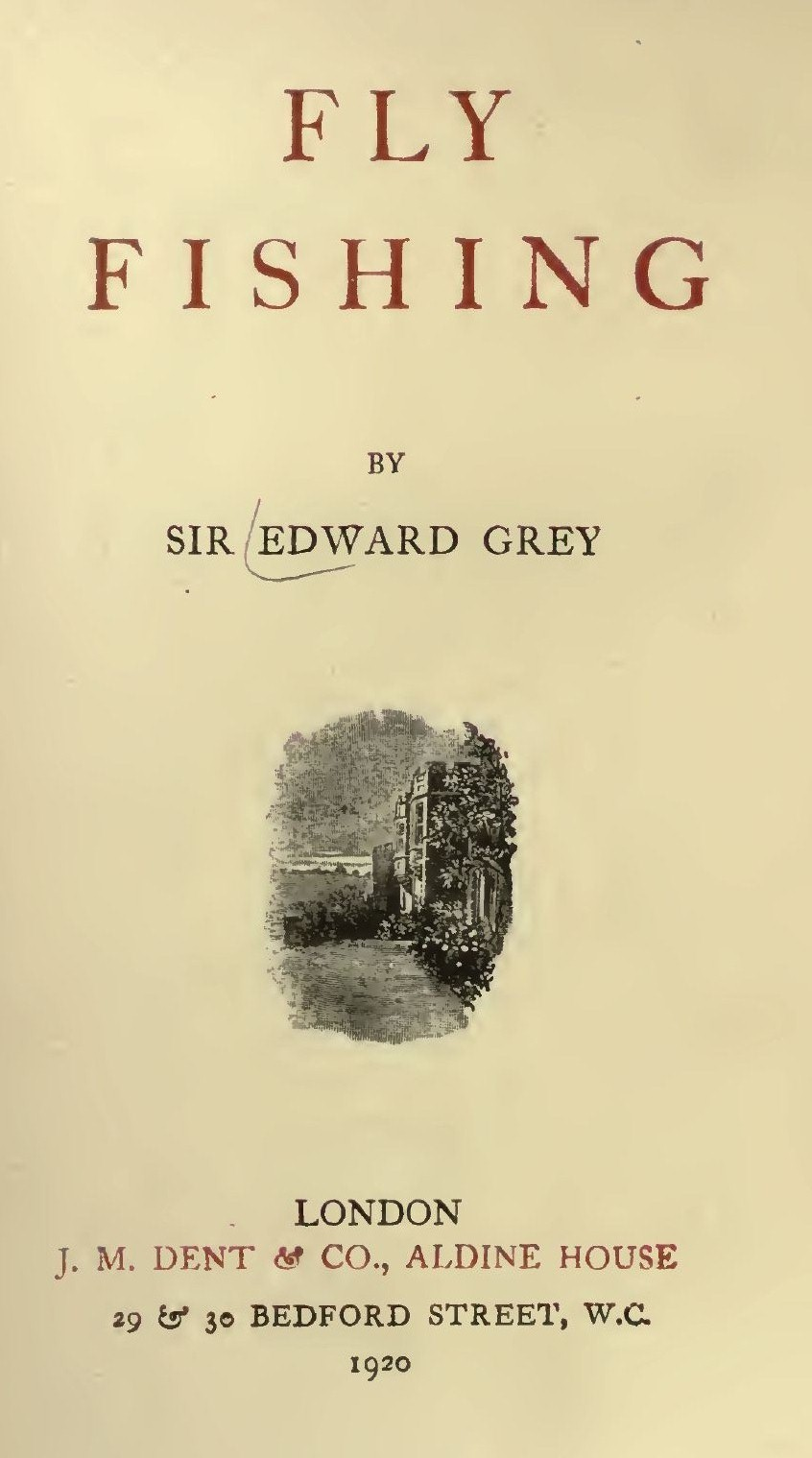
- Title page 4th edition, 1920
- Author: Edward Grey
- Illustrator: Eric Fitch Daglish (and others)
- Subject: Fly fishing
- Publisher: J. M. Dent and Co., London
- Publication date: 1899
- Pages: 276

Fly Fishing, first published in 1899 by English author and diplomat Edward Grey, 1st Viscount Grey of Fallodon (1862–1933), is a book about fly fishing English chalk streams and spate rivers for trout and salmon. It includes reminisces about the author's fly fishing experiences on Hampshire rivers. The book was in print for nearly 50 years and has been extensively reprinted in the 21st century.

== Synopsis ==
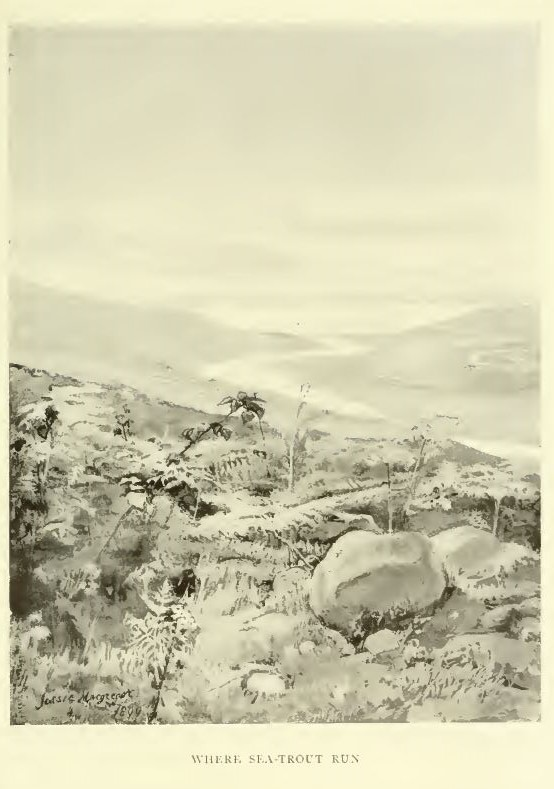
Where Sea Trout Run (1920 edition)

The work deals with fly fishing for trout, sea trout and salmon. Grey places presents fishing for sea trout as the pinnacle of fly fishing and describes the challenge of fly fishing for Atlantic salmon. On trout, he was the first writer of importance on the dry-fly who really knew what the wet-fly meant. Grey was an expert angler and he detailed much that is useful and instructive in prose that is clear and vigorous.

What are the qualities which a man most needs to become a good angler? Let us assume that he starts with keenness, that the prospect of hooking a fish produces in him that feeling of excitement which is the motive for a desire to succeed, is the beginning of delight in angling, and, like a first element, cannot be analysed. ...In angling, as in all other recreations into which excitement enters, we have to be upon our guard, so that we can at any moment throw a weight of self-control into the scale against misfortune, and happily we can study to some purpose, both to increase our pleasure in success and to lessen the distress caused by what goes ill.

— Introductory, Sir Edward Grey, Fly Fishing

Every October, Grey would obsess about the coming salmon season, six months away: "I lay awake in bed fishing in imagination the pools which I was not going to see before March at the earliest." The work is known for its turns of phrase, such as his 'exquisite blend of joy and fear' upon hooking a trout, and the 'delicious sense of impending discovery' the alert angler has on the stream.

== Author ==
Edward Grey, 1st Viscount Grey of Fallodon KG, PC, FZL, DL (25 April 1862 – 7 September 1933), better known as Sir Edward Grey, Bt, was a British Liberal statesman. He served as Foreign Secretary from 1905 to 1916, the longest continuous tenure of any person in that office. He is probably best remembered for his remark at the outbreak of the First World War: "The lamps are going out all over Europe. We shall not see them lit again in our time". Ennobled as Viscount Grey of Fallodon in 1916, he was Ambassador to the United States between 1919 and 1920 and Leader of the Liberal Party in the House of Lords between 1923 and 1924. He also gained distinction as an ornithologist and angler.

Grey was a contemporary of angler G. E. M. Skues at Winchester College, but it is unknown whether or not the two ever met or fished together while attending school. At the time of his writing Fly Fishing, Grey was considered one of the finest dry fly fisherman in England and a master of the Hampshire chalkstreams.

== Contents ==
From 1st edition:

- Chapter I – Introductory
- Chapter II – Dry Fly Fishing
- Chapter III – Dry Fly Fishing (continued)
- Chapter IV – Winchester
- Chapter V – Trout Fishing With The Wet Fly
- Chapter VI – Sea Trout Fishing
- Chapter VII – Salmon Fishing
- Chapter VIII – Tackle All
- Chapter IX – Experiments In Stocking
- Chapter X – Some Memories Of Early Days
- Index

=== List of illustrations ===
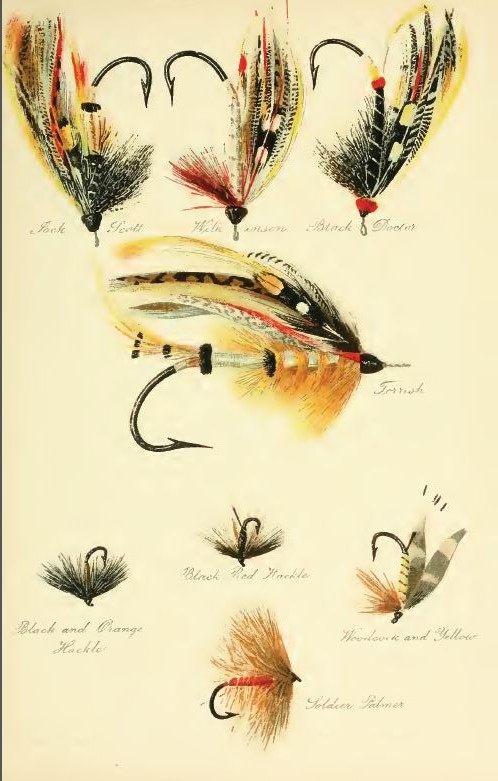
Salmon and Sea Trout Flies (1920 edition)

- The Haunt of the Trout, from a drawing by Jessie MacGregor – Frontispiece
- Hampshire Water Meadow, from a drawing by Jessie MacGregor
- Dry Flies and Wet Flies
- Winchester Cathedral, from a drawing by William Hyde
- St. Catherine's Hill, Winchester, from a drawing by William Hyde
- Where Sea Trout Run, from a drawing by Jessie MacGregor
- Salmon and Sea Trout Flies
- A Northumberland Burn, from a drawing by Jessie MacGregor

(The two plates of flies have been copied from specimens supplied by Messrs. Hardy of Alnwick)

== Reviews ==
- The London Times, in noting the first edition of Fly Fishing, stated:

Sir Edward Grey is celebrated as one of the very best dry-fly fishers of the age. ... His book on fly fishing is certainly one of the best of the many in which the time abounds. It is not too technical ... A just medium is hit on, and no more agreeable book can solace the angler while he waits (and a long wait it usually is) for the rise.

— The London Times (1899)

- John Hills in his A History of Fly Fishing for Trout (1921) praises Grey's prose:

Lord Grey of Fallodon published his book at the end of last century. The dry fly was then at its zenith, and the other system [the nymph] was receiving somewhat intolerant treatment. He was the first writer of importance on the dry fly who really knew what the wet fly meant. Himself the best and most devoted dry fly fisherman in England, he thus started unconsciously that restatement of values which Mr. Skues has carried so far. But he did more. He is gifted with the power to write fine prose.

— John Waller Hills, A History of Fly Fishing for Trout (1921)

- James Robb, in Notable Angling Literature (1945) ranks Grey's Fly Fishing very highly:

There are not many who have acquired angling fame by the publication of only one book. There are few, however: those who readily occur to one are Walton, Stewart, Scrope and Plunket Greene. To that select circle there must be added the name of Edward Grey, for Fly-fishing was his one angling book and it is ranked among the classics. Indeed some go so far as to regard it as the finest contribution that has ever been made.

— James Robb, Notable Angling Literature (1945)

== Editions ==
From: Hampton's Angling Bibliography

- First edition, April 1899, J. M. Dent, London, illustrated by Jessie MacGregor
- Second edition, July 1899, J. M. Dent, London, illustrated by Jessie MacGregor
- Third edition, 1901, J. M. Dent, London, illustrated by Jessie MacGregor
- Fourth edition, 1907, J. M. Dent, London, illustrated by Arthur Rackham
- Fifth edition, 1920, J. M. Dent, London, illustrated by Jessie MacGregor and William Hyde
- Sixth edition, 1928, J. M. Dent, London
- Seventh edition, 1930, J. M. Dent, London, illustrated by Eric Fitch Daglish
- Seventh edition (large paper), 1930, J. M. Dent, London
- Eighth edition, 1934, J. M. Dent, London, illustrated by Eric Fitch Daglish
- Ninth edition, 1947, J. M. Dent, London, illustrated by Eric Fitch Daglish
- Ninth edition (French), Peche A La Mouche, 1947, Librairie des Champs-Élysées, Paris

From abebooks.com

- Modern Fishing Classics Series edition, 1984, Andre Deutsch Ltd, London
- Pranava Books, 2009. Reprinted from 1920 edition.
- Reprint of 1899 edition, Adegi Graphics LLC, New York, 2011

== See also ==
- Bibliography of fly fishing
