= The American Angler's Book =

1864 book by Thaddeus Norris

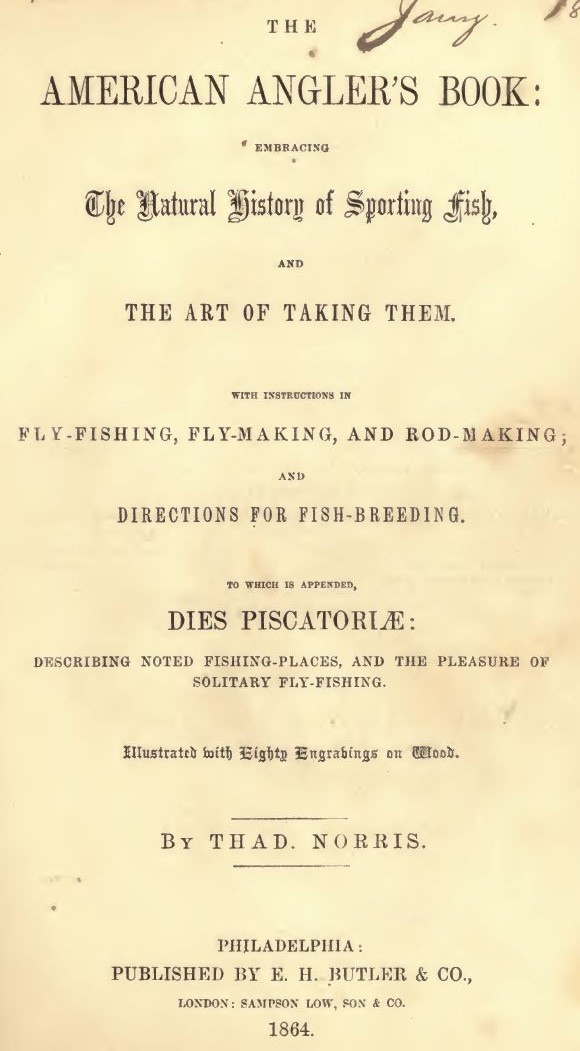
- Title page of The American Angler's Book, Thaddeus Norris, 1864
- Author: Thaddeus Norris
- Language: English
- Subject: Angling, Fly fishing
- Publisher: E. H. Butler & Co., Philadelphia, Pennsylvania
- Publication date: 1864
- Publication place: United States
- Pages: 604

The American Angler's Book Embracing the Natural History of Sporting Fish and the Art of Taking Them with Instructions in Fly-Fishing, Fly-Making, and Rod-Making and Directions for Fish-Breeding, to which is appended Dies Piscatoriae Describing Noted Fishing-Places, and The Pleasure of Solitary Fly-Fishing is an early American angling book by Thaddeus Norris (1811-1877) first published in 1864. Norris was known as Uncle Thad and commonly referred to in American angling history as "The American Walton".

== Synopsis ==
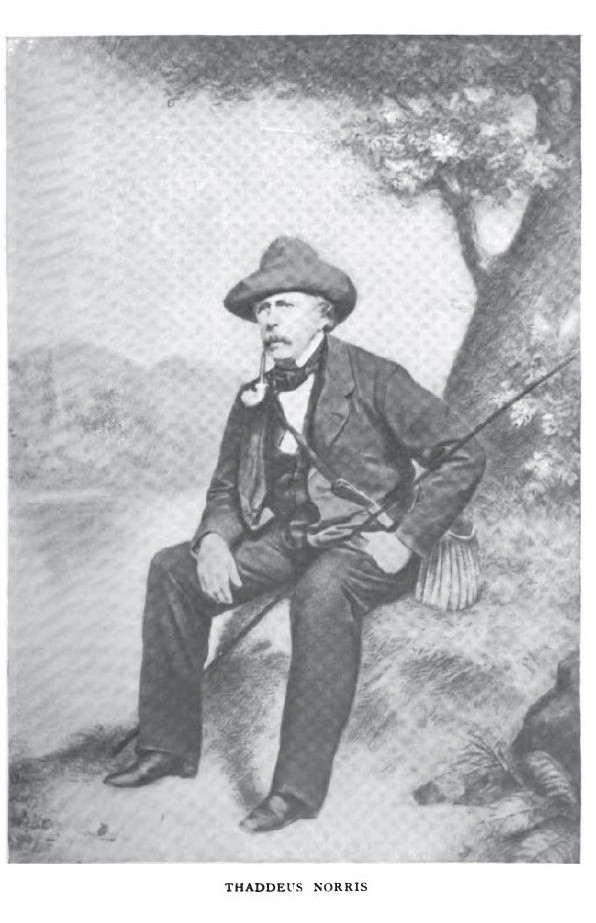
Portrait of Thaddeus Norris from Fred Mather's My Angling Friends (1901)

The American Angler's Book provides encyclopedic coverage of all aspects of fishing as practiced in North America in the mid-1800s. It covers tackle, techniques, target species and the best fishing locations. It has been credited with being the first significant American work to cover aspects of fly fishing.

== Reviews ==
Shortly after its publication, the New York Times praised the work as encyclopedic and well illustrated on the subject of angling.

Mr. NORRIS is a true disciple of WALTON (Izaak Walton), and besides the technical and scientific information so liberally supplied, the book bears evidence of refined feeling and cultivated taste. It is an edition to the angler's Library, of which every American "Piscator" may feel proud.

— New York Times Book Review, October 8, 1864

In his 1901 work My Angling Friends, pisciculturist Fred Mather wrote of Norris:

His American Angler's Book was the first good American book on angling. It treated of native fishes and fishing while books up to that time were rehashes of British publications.

— Fred Mather, My Angling Friends (1901)

In a survey of the Reed Draper Angling Collection at Central Michigan University these comments were made on Norris's work in The American Angler's Book:

The importance of Norris's book derives from its comprehensive nature and its American perspective. It also recognizes the need to conserve stocks of fish and emphasizes the qualitative and reflective nature of the sport.

This ambivalence was clearly evident one of the most highly regarded angling tracts of the nineteenth century, The American Angler's Book, written by Thaddeus Norris (1811–1877), affectionately referred to by later generations of anglers as "Uncle Thad" (Goodspeed 1939:219; Gingrich 1974:150). Norris set about defining the gentle American angler by using negation and denial to slip past ambiguities; the lion's share of his introduction was devoted to a homily filled with proscriptions. High on the list of things-to-be-avoided was the slavish imitation of English customs.

— Deep Trout: Angling in Popular Culture, William and Catherine Washabaugh, 2000

== Contents ==
- Chapter I Angling (pages 27–38)
- Chapter II General Remarks on Fish (pages )
- Chapter III Tackle in General (pages )
- Chapter IV The Perch Family-Percidae (pages )
- Chapter V The Pike Family (pages 77–125 )
- Chapter VI The Carp Family-Cyprinidae (pages 126-152)
- Chapter VII The Herring Family Clupeidae (pages 165-176)
- Chapter VIII Catfish and Eels (pages 177-190)
- Chapter IX The Salmon Family Salmonidae (pages 191-276)
- Chapter X Salt-water and Fishing (pages 277-304)
- Chapter XI Trout Fly-Fishing—Outfit and Tackle (pages 305-326)
- Chapter XII Trout Fly-Fishing—The Stream (pages 327-344)
- Chapter XIII Salmon Fishing (pages 345-378)
- Chapter XIV Salmon Rivers of the British Provinces (pages 379-404)
- Chapter XV Repairs, Knots, Loops and Receipts (pages 405-418)
- Chapter XVI Fly-Making (pages 419-440)
- Chapter XVII Rod-Making (pages 441-458)
- Chapter XVIII Fish Breeding (pages 459-488)
- Dies Piscatoriae (pages 489-599) (Latin for "A Day of Fishing")
  - The "Houseless Anglers"
  - The Noonday Roast
    - First Nooning—Trout-fishing in Hamilton County, New York
    - Second Nooning—Trout-fishing in New Hampshire
    - Third Nooning—Trout-fishing in the regions of Lake Superior
    - Fourth Nooning—Trout-fishing in the Adirondacks
  - Fly-Fishing Alone
  - The Angler's Sabbath
  - Conclusion

== Editions ==
- First - 1864 published by Butler, Philadelphia
- Second - 1865 published by Porter & Coates, Philadelphia (A Memorial Edition)
- Third - 1868 published by Porter & Coates, Philadelphia
- Printings by Porter & Coates, Philadelphia 1881, 1886, 1891
- Limited Edition Reprint, 1994 by Derrydale Press, New York
- Excerpts - Norris on Trout Fishing: A Lifetime of Angling Insights (Fly-Fishing Classics Series) (2008) Edited by Paul Schullery

== See also ==
- Bibliography of fly fishing
