= Richard Baggallay (cricketer) =

English cricketer

Personal information
- Full name: Richard Romer Claude Baggallay
- Born: 4 May 1884; Kensington, London
- Died: 12 December 1975 (aged 91); Kensington, London
- Batting: Right-handed
- Role: Batsman
- Relatives: Mervyn Baggallay (brother); Thomas Baggallay (cousin)

Domestic team information
- Years: Team
- 1912–1919: Derbyshire
- FC debut: 1 August 1912 Derbyshire v Australians
- Last FC: 9 July 1919 Derbyshire v Somerset

Career statistics
Competition	First-class
Matches	31
Runs scored	688
Batting average	11.86
100s/50s	0/3
Top score	88
Catches/stumpings	25/–
- Source: CricketArchive, 11 February 2010

Richard Romer Claude Baggallay DSO MC (4 May 1884 – 12 December 1975) was an English army officer and cricketer who played first-class cricket for Derbyshire between 1912 and 1919 and captained the side in 1913, 1914 and 1919.

Bagallay was born at Kensington the son of Claude Baggallay K.C. a barrister of Wilderwick, East Grinstead, Sussex. He was educated at Marlborough College and joined the 11th Hussars.

Baggallay made his cricketing debut for Derbyshire in the 1912 season playing in two matches, the first a draw against the Australians in which he made little impression. He was captain in the 1913 season when Derbyshire finished 13th in the table and again in the 1914 season when they finished 12th. He then fought in World War I between 1914 and 1919. He served in the Irish Guards and was successively captain and major, seeing service at the Somme and Ypres. He was mentioned in despatches and awarded DSO and MC in 1919.

After the war Baggallay resumed the captaincy of Derbyshire in the 1919 season. However, after three matches that season he was called to Ireland as Military Secretary to the Viceroy of Ireland, Lord Ypres and was thereafter unable to play for the county.

Baggallay was a right-hand batsman and occasional wicket-keeper. He played 59 innings in 31 matches for Derbyshire. His highest score was 88 and his average 11.86. His last recorded match was in 1922 for the Household Cavalry against an Eton side that include Alec Douglas-Home.

Baggallay became Lieutenant Colonel and in World War II was commandant of the Alien internment camps on the Isle of Man between 1940 and 1942. He died at Kensington aged 91.

Baggallay married, firstly, Kathleen Constance Charlotte FitzGerald Murphy in 1910 and secondly Phyllis Mildred Harriet Ford in 1922. He had three children by his first wife. His brother Mervyn Baggallay played cricket for Cambridge University, and a cousin Thomas Baggallay played for Surrey.

Sporting positions
Preceded by John Chapman	Derbyshire cricket captains 1913-1914	Succeeded by Leonard Oliver
