= Baggley =

Baggley is a surname. Notable people with the surname include:

- Barry Baggley (born 2002), Northern Irish footballer
- Herma Albertson Baggley (1896–1981), American naturalist

== See also ==
- Bagley (disambiguation)
