= Facsimile (disambiguation) =

A facsimile is a copy or reproduction of an old book, manuscript, map, art print, or other item of historical value that is as true to the original source as possible.

Facsimile may also refer to:

- Facsimile, a 1946 orchestral composition by Leonard Bernstein
- Fax, short for facsimile, the telephonic transmission of scanned printed material
- Facsimile Productions, a British theatre production company
- The Facsimiles (No. 1, 2 and 3), part of the Book of Abraham in Mormonism
