= T C Ivens =

English reservoir fly angler

- Born: 22 May 1921; Northampton, England
- Died: 9 July 1988 (aged 67); Northampton, England
- Spouse: Ruth Ivens
- Writing career
- Genre: Angling
- Subject: Reservoir Fly Fishing
- Notable works: Stillwater Fly-Fishing: A modern guide to angling in reservoirs and lakes

Thomas Coleman Ivens (22 May 1921 – 9 July 1988) was an English reservoir fly angler and author.

Tom Ivens was born on 22 May 1921 in Northampton and studied at Northampton Grammar School and Seale-Hayne Agricultural College. Between 1944 and 1947 he was in command of naval minesweepers. He was on the staff of the Fishing Gazette from 1953 to 1956. A biography of Tom Ivens entitled The Fly Fishing Legacy of T C Ivens was published in 2021.

== Fly Fishing in England and Wales ==
Although fishing on rivers in England goes back many centuries (Dame Juliana Berners wrote on the subject in 1486), fly fishing on stillwaters has a more recent history. It began at the turn of the twentieth century with the construction of the water supply reservoirs which were stocked with trout; the first ones being Thrybergh Reservoir around 1880, Lake Vyrnwy in 1891, Ravensthorpe Reservoir in 1895, and Blagdon Lake in 1904.

In the early days English reservoir fly anglers copied the method currently being used on the Scottish lochs of employing large and colourful ‘fancy’ flies that were retrieved quickly in an attempt to attract the attention of the trout. There was, in general, little attempt to imitate the trout’s natural food.

That is how things stood until Dr Bell of Wrington began to fish Blagdon Lake in 1920, shortly after his return from WW1. Dr Bell and adopted a different approach by studying the natural creatures and mimicking them in both form and movement. When Tom Ivens returned from WW2 he took a similar line, by offering flies that the trout would take as food.

== Reservoir fly fishing ==
Reservoir Trout Fly Patterns designed by T C Ivens from his original series dated around mid-1960 [Top left to bottom right} Brown & Green Nymph, Brown Nymph, Black & Peacock Spider, Green & Yellow Nymph, Green Nymph, Jersey Herd, Alexandra, Pretty Pretty

With the increased interest in reservoir fly fishing at the end of World War II Tom Ivens published Stillwater Fly-Fishing in 1952, which ran to four editions, and he became one of the most influential fly anglers of the time. In the first edition he introduced his original series of reservoir fly patterns that have since become standards.

Ivens’ philosophy regarding fly selection was based on fish behaviour and he proposed that ‘exact imitation’ on reservoirs was unnecessary and that ‘general representations’, to suggest a range of food creatures, should form the first line of attack whenever possible.

Ivens stressed the importance of long distance casting and favoured the use of slowly recovered ‘deceiver’ nymph fly patterns when the conditions allowed. His original series of flies included five nymph patterns, the best known being his Black & Peacock Spider which is still in common use today.

For those occasions when nymphs were not suitable (for example during strong winds when it is not possible to keep in touch with slowly-recovered flies) he used quickly-retrieved ‘attractor’ patterns and his Jersey Herd fly is again still widely used.

Supplementary Reservoir Trout Fly Patterns designed by T C Ivens [Top left to bottom right} Claret Buzzer, Black Buzzer, Green Buzzer, Cinnamon & Gold, Fuzzy Buzzy, Gentile, Hairwing Butcher, Polar Bear, Black Knight, Tandem Black & Peacock Spider Lure

The opening of Grafham Water in 1966 brought about new problems for fly anglers due to its large size (and most importantly its depth) which resulted in stratification and trout which remained deep-down for much of the time. Ivens devised new methods to tackle these deep-lying fish and designed a supplementary series of flies to accompany the new techniques which were described in the third edition of his book in 1970.

== Contribution to innovations in fly fishing tackle ==
Davenport and Fordham Ltd of Ware, Hertfordshire produced a series of split-cane and later fibreglass fly rods designed by Tom Ivens bearing his name. To match the rods Davenport and Fordham introduced a range of 'Superflyte' shooting heads that were developed in conjunction with Ivens.

Being able to deliver the flies a long distance is irrelevant if the leader does not turn over and straighten correctly. To facilitate leader turnover Tom Ivens developed a series of tapered and double-tapered nylon leaders appropriate for a variety of conditions. Advances in fly line design have to some extent negated this necessity today.

The 'Stillwater' boat manufactured by Thanetcraft of New Malden, Surrey, designed in collaboration with Ivens, incorporated several unique features for a fishing boat: high seats for a better casting position that were well-spaced apart, fixing rings for the mooring ropes, anchors and drogues mounted on the exterior of the hull, and a snag-free interior to avoid fly line tangles.

== Later years and death ==
Tom Ivens' legacy is best summed up in the words of Conrad Voss Bark in The New Encyclopaedia of Fly Fishing as follows: 'His aim was to put reservoir fishing on as scientific and simple a basis as possible, and his book and his whole philosophy had an instant appeal to large numbers of men who were being attracted to reservoir fishing for the first time since World War II, as well as those who had previously been fishing traditional wet flies without knowing quite why.' Reservoir fly fishing has evolved considerably since then but the foundations laid in those early years are relevant today.

He died in Northampton in 1988, aged 67.

== Published works ==
Stillwater Fly-Fishing by T C Ivens (four editions), Andre Deutsch (1952, 1961, 1970, 1973)

Pond Culture of Food Fishes (thesis) by T C Ivens, Seale-Hayne Agricultural College (1952)

The Art of Angling (in three volumes) edited by Kenneth Mansfield (contributor), Caxton Publishing Co. (1957)

The Angler’s Year No. 2 edited by Peter Wheat (contributor), Pelham Books (1971)
