= A Book on Angling =

1867 work of angling literature by Francis Francis

A Book on Angling – Being a complete treatise on the art of angling in every branch
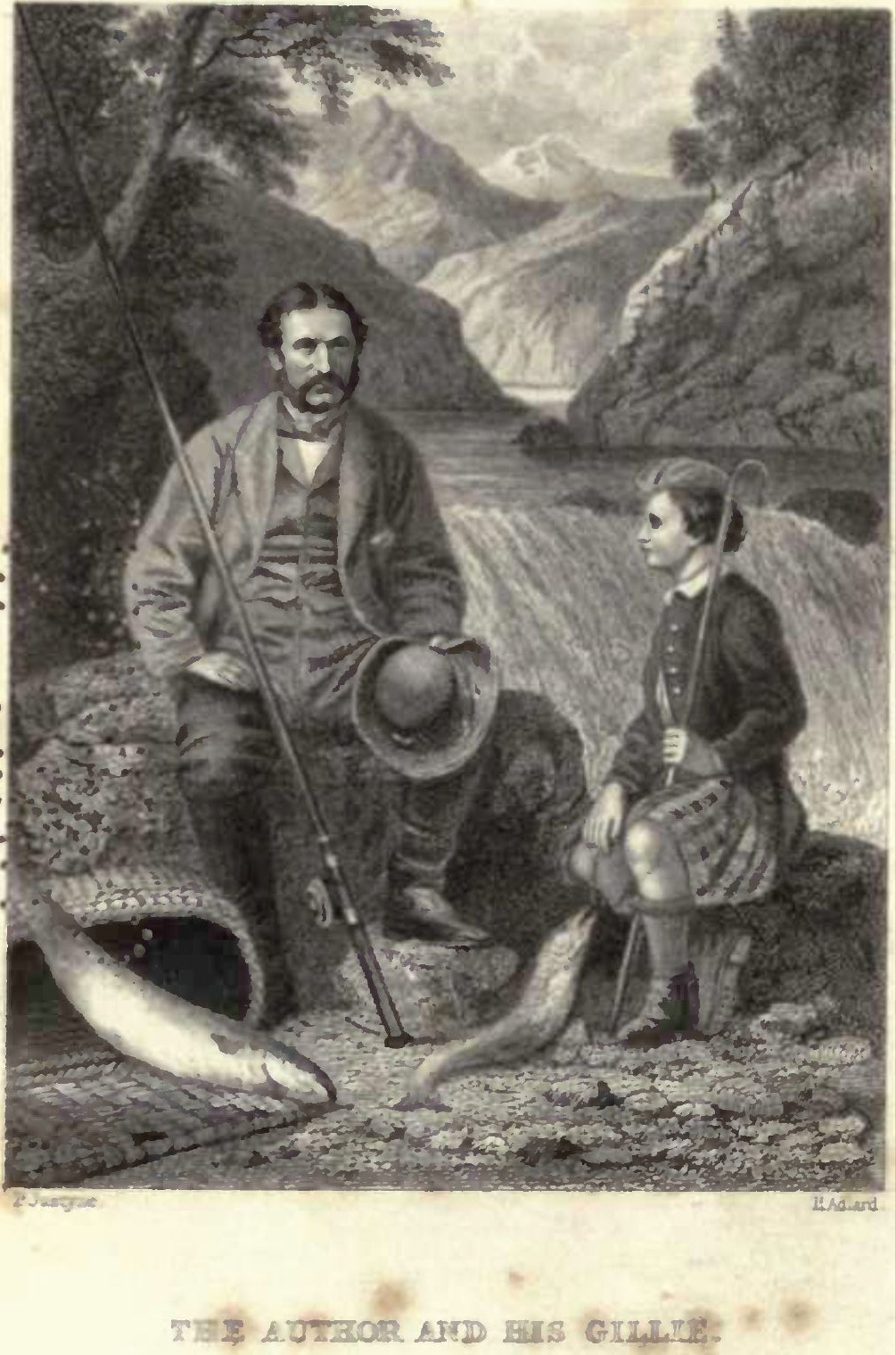
- Frontispiece from 4th Edition (1876) – The Author and His Gillie
- Author: Francis Francis
- Language: English
- Subject: Fishing, Fly fishing
- Publisher: Longmans, Green and Company, London
- Publication date: 1867
- Publication place: Great Britain
- Pages: 508

A Book on Angling – Being a complete treatise on the art of angling in every branch is a work of angling literature with significant fly fishing content written by Francis Francis, angling editor to The Field and published in London in 1867 by Longmans, Green and Company.

== Synopsis ==
A Book on Angling is best described by the author himself in the preface to the first edition:

When first infected with the fever of Angling, more years ago than I care to count up, my ambition was to catch every species of freshwater fish, from the minnow up to the salmon, which inhabits our British waters. That satisfied, my next desire was to write a work, which should contain within one volume (as far as might be possible) the fullest and most varied information upon Angling generally, in every branch of the art, which had ever been published; and with this resolve I commenced collecting the matter for the present work nearly twenty years ago. Taken up and laid aside from time to time, little by little it has steadily progressed towards completion. In the course of that twenty years I took occasion to visit and to fish nearly every river of note in the kingdom, my connection with 'The Field' affording me peculiar facilities for obtaining permission to fish very many waters which are closely locked against the general public; and I have roamed England, Scotland, Wales, and Ireland over to gather fresh knowledge, and to put it into a practical and concentrated form for the use of my readers.

In inducting the tyro into the mysteries of the art, I have endeavored to make every direction and information as clear and practicable as possible. This work is intended to be a useful and not merely a decorative one: thus, the plates are not for the sake of ornamentation, but for direction, and as an aid to the student of tackle-making and fly-tying. Each illustration of tackle is really needed, and the flies shown are not a mere selection of gorgeous and pretty subjects, or I should have chosen very differently; but each fly is a specimen of some separate class of flies, in which a special peculiarity of manufacture is evident.

I have to thank many kind friends for assistance in lending tackle and flies as subjects for the engravings, and also for description, as will be found in the body of the work.

I have given much time to this book, but I have given it willingly, for it was indeed and in truth a labour of love. Whether the Angling public, to whom I dedicate it (desiring no more potent patron), will appreciate my labours remains to be seen; and so, without further apology if an attempt to supply a long-felt and obvious want, the existence of which few persons have been in a position to know and feel so well as myself, be thought to require an apology into their hands I commit it.

FRANCIS FRANCIS. THE FIRS, TWICKENHAM : 1867

== Reviews ==
In 1881, Osmund Lambert in Angling Literature in England wrote:

Under the title" A Book on Angling," by Francis Francis, we have a very comprehensive treatise on the art of angling in all its branches. Mr. Francis is not only a well-known author, but also a well-known practical fisherman of great experience. No book so well answers the angler's purpose as the one just mentioned, which has already passed through five editions.

— Osmund Lambert, 1881

In 1920, when A Book on Angling was reprinted, Sir Herbert Maxwell, a noted Scottish angler penned this in the Editor's Introduction:

...but it is a much further cry to that distant day in 1867 when I

opened a parcel containing Francis Francis's A Book on Angling, a gift from the author. Of the intervening halfcentury I have spent, serious persons may say wasted a considerable section by the waterside, and another section by

the fireside combing some of the vast amount of angling literature that has flowed from the press during that period; but in all these years I have never detected any fallacy in Francis's precepts for such branches of the fisher craft as I have practised, neither have I handled any book which gives such succinct and trustworthy instruction in every form of freshwater angling. Excellent treatises upon this or that department of the sport might be named; but Francis dealt with them all; his experience of them was universal, his knowledge encyclopaedic.

— Sir Herbert Maxwell, 1920

James Robb in an entire chapter devoted to Francis Francis in Notable Angling Literature (1945) said of A Book on Angling:

A Book on Angling. This is admittedly the most valuable of his many contributions. For almost twenty years Francis collected his material; he visited and fished nearly every river of note in the kingdom in search of information. The tangile result was a comprehensive manual, first published in 1867, dealing with every known branch of fresh-water angling and set out in practical and concentrated form. The sixth edition (1885) is still on sale and is in fair demand.

— James Robb, 1945

In 1974, noted American writer Arnold Gingrich in his The Fishing in Print commented on Francis, Francis as a writer and his influence on notable American angler Theodore Gordon:

A man [Gordon] of taste and intelligence, he was a good, restrained, yet warm and exciting fishing writer, a reader who knew Chaucer as well as Walton and Thoreau, Thad Norris (The American Angler's Book, 1864) as well as Frederic Halford (Dry Fly Fishing in Theory and Practice, 1889), and a devoted follower of the great Francis, Francis (A Book on Angling, 1867).

— Arnold Gingrich, 1974

In 2002, 135 years after the 1st edition of A Book of Angling, Tony Hayter in his biography of Frederic M. Halford wrote:

No one responded to this charm more than the redoubtable Francis Francis, Angling Editor of The Field from 1856 to 1883. This journal had paramount influence in the sporting world of the nineteenth century--a research project into the history of almost any sport in Britain would have to begin with The Field. For anglers it played an important role in pulling together numerous angling practices and attitudes, and assisting them towards becoming developed schools or doctrines. And for nearly thirty years the writing was mainly done by Francis (F.F. to his friends.) The Field paid him an honorarium of £200 a year, for which they got good value.

— Tony Hayter, F.M. Halford and the Dry Fly Revolution, 2002

== Contents ==
From the 4th Edition (1876)

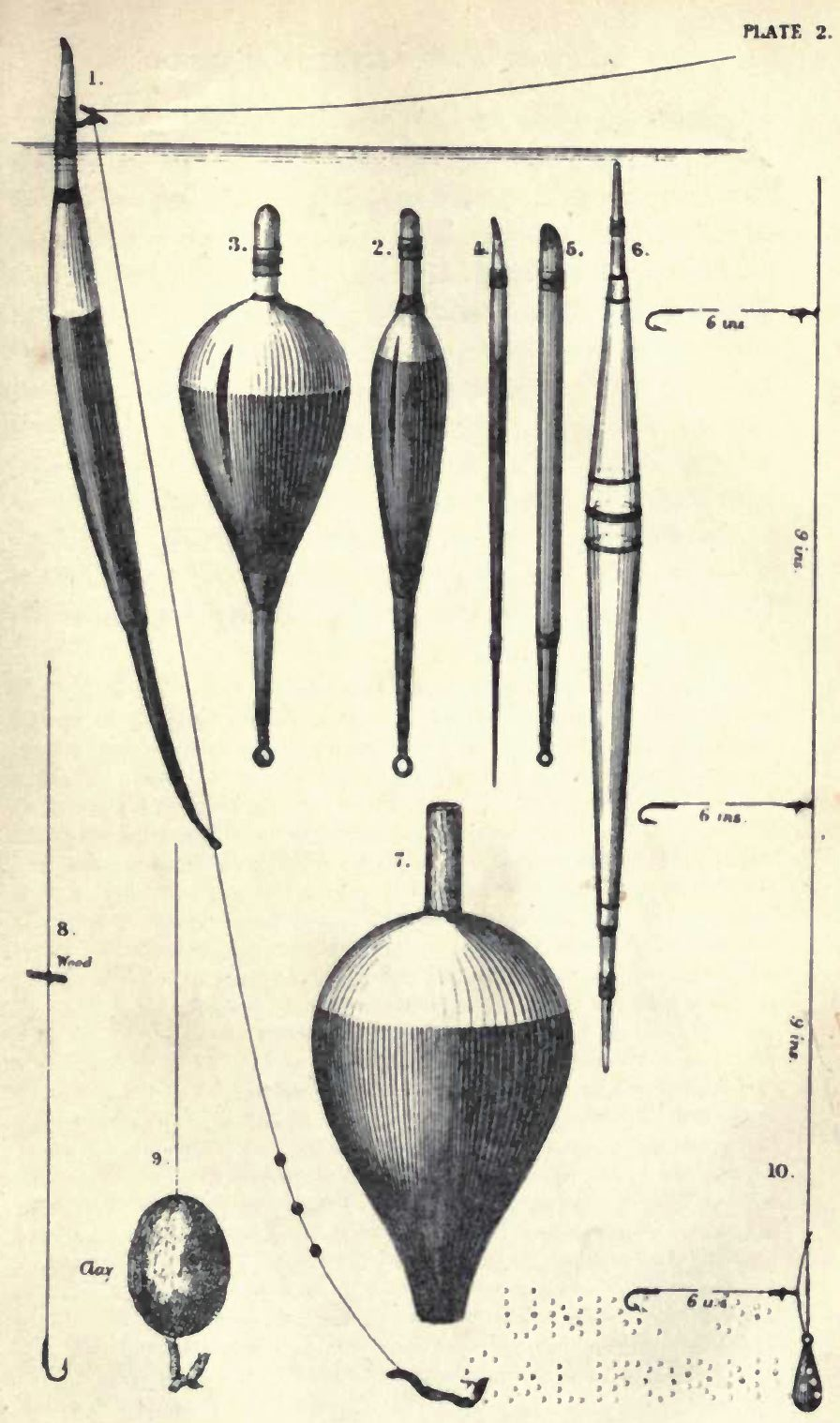
Plate II-The Slider and other Floats

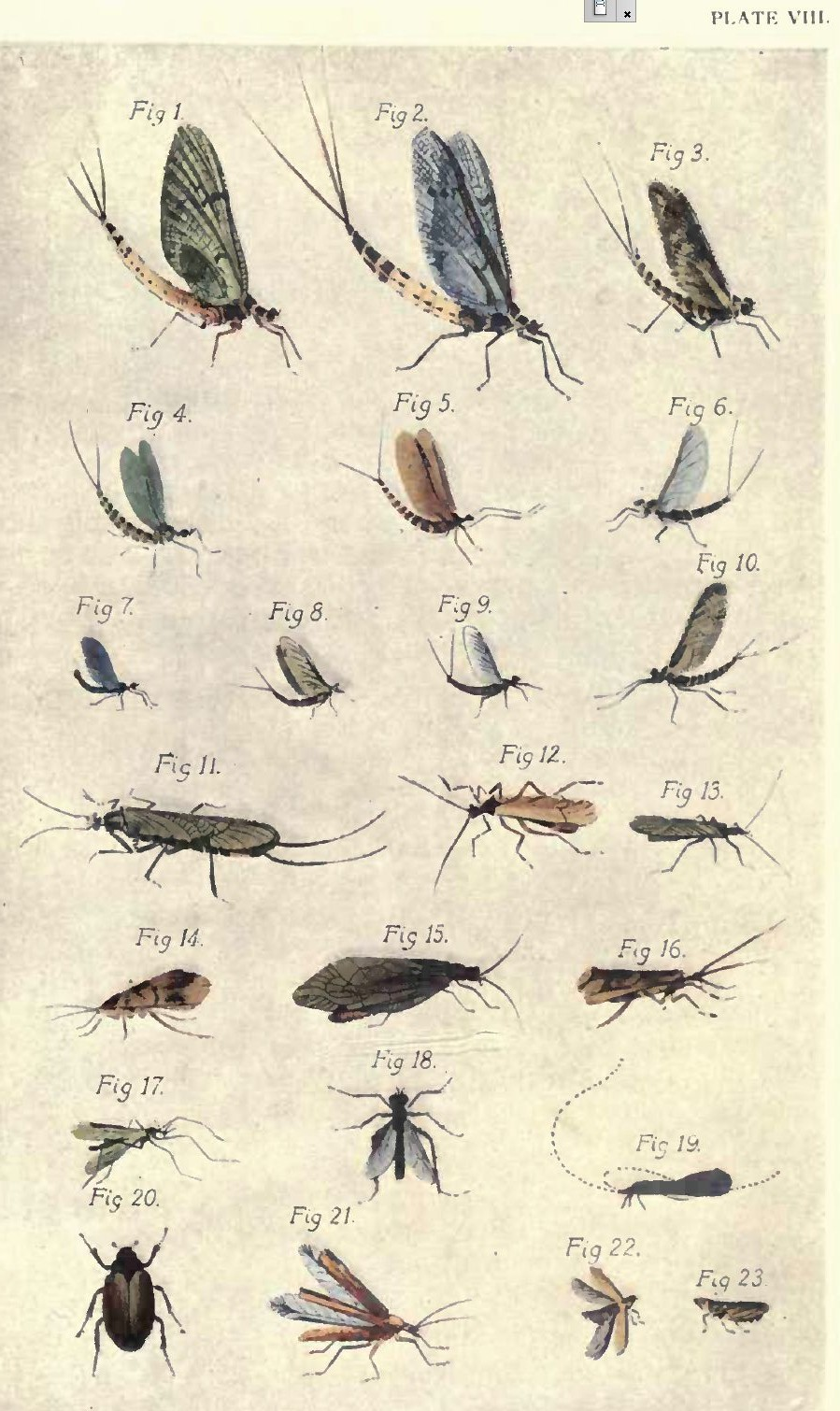
Plate VIII – Natural Trout Flies

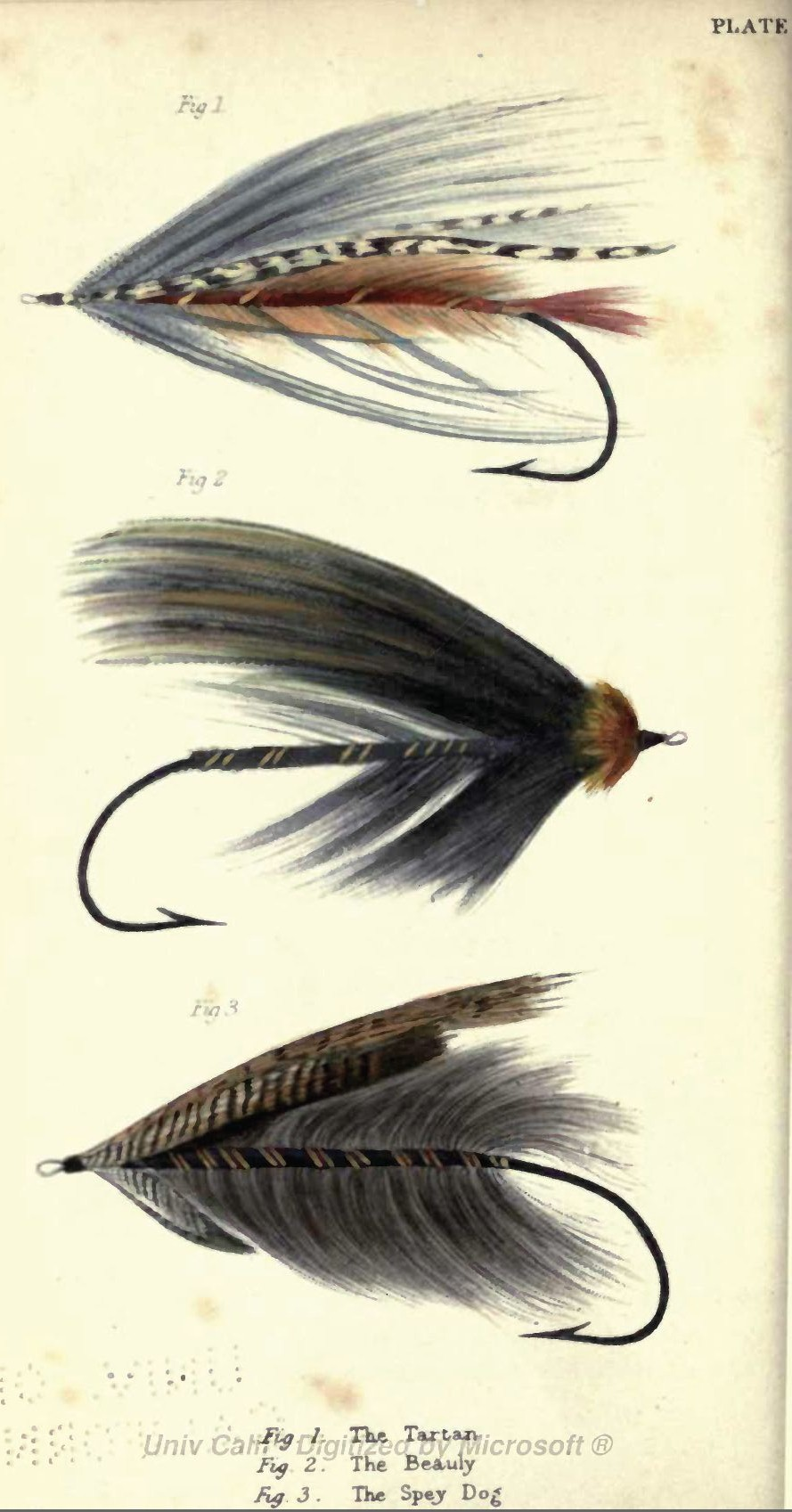
Plate XI-Salmon Flies

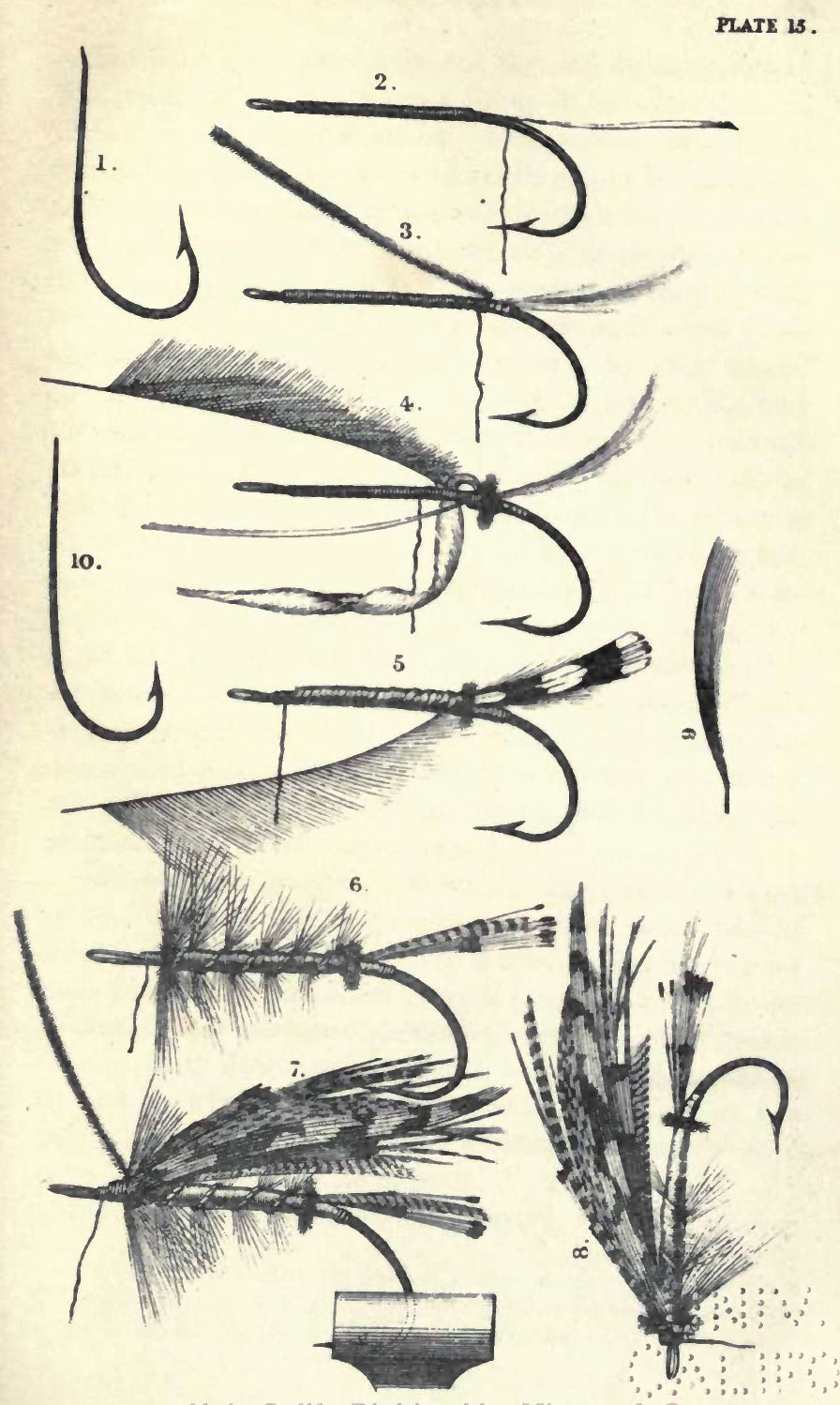
Plate XV – Salmon Fly Dressing

- Chapter I – Bottom-Fishing
  - The Origin of Angling, Pond-Fishing, Punt-Fishing, The Norfolk Style, Bank-Fishing, The Gudgeon, The Pope, The Bleak, The Roach, The Rudd, The Dace, The Chub, The Barbel – 1
- Chapter II – Bottom-Fishing Continued.
  - Nottingham Angling, Casting From the Reel, Daceing, Tight Corking, The Slider, etc. – 61
- Chapter III – Bottom-Fishing Continued
  - The Bream, The Carp, The Tench, The Eel, The Perch, Paternostering, etc. – 73
- Chapter IV – Mid-Water Fishing.
  - The Pike, Spinning, Trolling With the Dead Gorge, Live Baiting, etc. – 100
- Chapter V – Artificial Fly-Fishing.
  - Varieties of Trout, Instructions as to Rods and Tackle, How To Use Them, Weather, How To Choose Flies, Dress, Night-fishing -138
- Chapter VI – Artificial Flies
  - Contrast of Systems, Copying Nature And Copying Nothing, List of Flies For Each Month -185
- Chapter VII – On Lake-Fishing, Etc.
  - Lake-Fishing, Daping, The Creeper, The Beetle, The Worm – 250
- Chapter VIII – Spinning For Trout
  - Spinning for Large Trout, Spinning for Trout In Small Streams, The Par-Tail, The Grayling – 278
- Chapter IX – The Salmon
  - The Rod, The Reel and Line, How To Use Them, Casting, Striking, Playing A Salmon, Sea-Trout Fishing – 303
- Chapter X – Salmon Flies.
  - List of Salmon Flies, General Flies, List of Flies for Scotch Rivers – 333
- Chapter XI – Salmon Flies Continued.
  - List of Flies for Irish Rivers – 392
- Chapter XII – Salmon Flies Continued
  - List of Flies for Wales and England, List of Sea-Trout Flies – 426

== Other Editions ==
From Antiquarian Book Exchange and Bibliotheca Piscatoria-A Catalogue Of Books On Angling, The Fisheries and Fish-Culture, With Bibliographical Notes and an Appendix Of Citations Touching On Angling and fishing from Old English authors, Westwood and Satchell (1883)

- Francis, Francis (August 1867). A Book on Angling (2nd ed.). London: Longmans, Green and Company.
- Francis, Francis (1872). A Book on Angling (3rd ed.). London: Longmans, Green and Company.
- Francis, Francis (1876). A Book on Angling (4th ed.). London: Longmans, Green and Company.
- Francis, Francis (1880). A Book on Angling (5th ed.). London: Longmans, Green and Company.
- Francis, Francis (1885). A Book on Angling (6th ed.). London: Longmans, Green and Company.
- Francis, Francis (1920). Sir Herbert Maxwell (ed.). A Book on Angling (2nd Edition Reprint ed.). London: Herbert Jenkins Limited.
- Francis, Francis (1920). Sir Herbert Maxwell (ed.). A Book on Angling (1st US ed.). Philadelphia: J.B. Lippincott Company.
- Francis, Francis (1993). A Book on Angling (6th edition facsimile ed.). Lyon, Mississippi: Derrydale Press.
- Francis, Francis (1995). A Book on Angling (1st edition facsimile ed.). Camden, South Carolina: John Culler & Sons. ISBN 1-887269-04-5.
- Francis, Francis (1996). A Book on Angling (Fly-Fishers Classic Library 5th edition facsimile ed.). Devon: Bovey Tracy.
- Francis, Francis (2008). A Book on Angling (4th edition facsimile ed.). Whitefish, MT: Kessinger Publishing. ISBN 978-1-4370-1469-3.

== See also ==
Bibliography of fly fishing
