= Seale-Hayne College =

Coordinates: 50.546°N 3.657°W

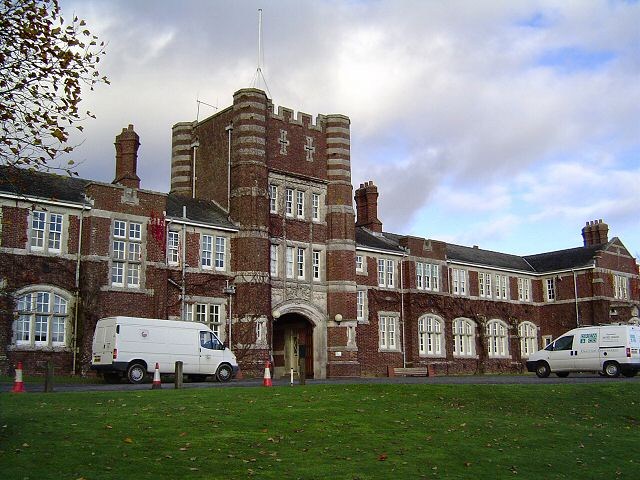
Seale-Hayne College

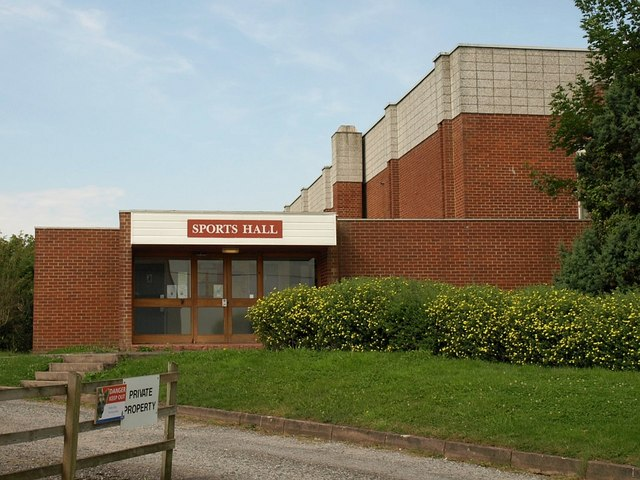
Sports hall

Seale-Hayne College was an agricultural college in Devon, England, which operated from 1919 to 2005. It was the only agricultural college in the United Kingdom whose buildings were purpose designed and built. It was located 3 miles from Newton Abbot.

The college was established in accordance with the will of Charles Seale Hayne (1833–1903), a Liberal politician who was a Devon land-owner. The college was built between 1912 and 1914, but its opening was delayed by the start of the First World War. During the war it served as a training centre for Land Girls, and in 1918 and 1919 it operated as a military neurasthenic hospital for the treatment of soldiers suffering from shell shock.

The first students arrived in 1920. During the Second World War the college was used for the training of the second Women's Land Army. After the war the college was significantly expanded, and by 1986 there were over 1,000 students. In 1989 the college merged with Plymouth Polytechnic to form the Seale-Hayne Faculty of Agriculture, Food & Land Use, Polytechnic South West, and Polytechnic South West became the University of Plymouth in 1992. In 2005 the university closed the college, and staff and students were transferred to Plymouth.

Until 31 January 2019 the Seale-Hayne site was used by Dame Hannah Rogers Trust, which provided education, therapy, care and respite for children and young people with profound physical disabilities as well as a centre to hold events to raise funds for the Dame Hannah Rogers School in Ivybridge.

Notable former pupils of the college, known as "Seale-Haynians", include:

- T C Ivens (1921–1988), orchid grower, fly fisherman and author.
- Richard Ashworth (born 1947), dairy farmer and former Member of the European Parliament (MEP).
- Adam Henson (born 1966), English farmer, author and television presenter.
