= Bagguley =

Bagguley is a surname. Notable people with the surname include:

- Howard Bagguley (1909–1999), Canadian skier
- Richard Bagguley (born 1955), English muralist and artist
- Robert Bagguley (1873–1946), English cricketer
- William Bagguley (1866–1936), English cricketer

== See also ==
- Baguley (disambiguation)
