= Stephen Howarth =

English painter

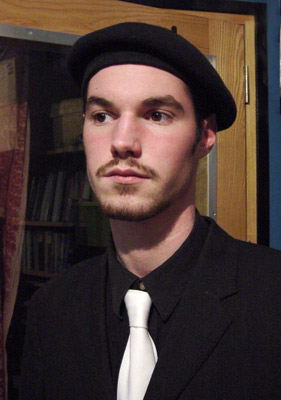
- Born: Stephen Purbeck Howarth; 23 July 1981 (age 44); Lewisham, London, England
- Known for: Painting, poetry and theatre
- Movement: Stuckism

Stephen Purbeck Howarth (born 23 July 1981), known as S.P., is a poet, Stuckist artist and actor. He was expelled from college for his paintings. He has demonstrated against the Turner prize at the Tate gallery.

== Life and work ==
Stephen Howarth was born in Lewisham, London and educated at St Christopher School, Letchworth. He is severely dyslexic. In 2000, he attended Camberwell College of Arts and was in the Students for Stuckism group. In 2002, he was "expelled from the painting course for doing paintings." He said:

I was told I had been failed, because I had not done any work. When I said that I had brought my work in for assessment and that there were paintings in my space, I was told that they didn't count as work, because they didn't show development of ideas. I said that my idea was to paint spontaneously and express what I felt. I was told that this was not an acceptable idea in 'contemporary practice'.

The incident was reported in The Times with the headline "Art students accuse college of failing to teach them the basics". Other students supported him and there were also letters of support in the newspaper.

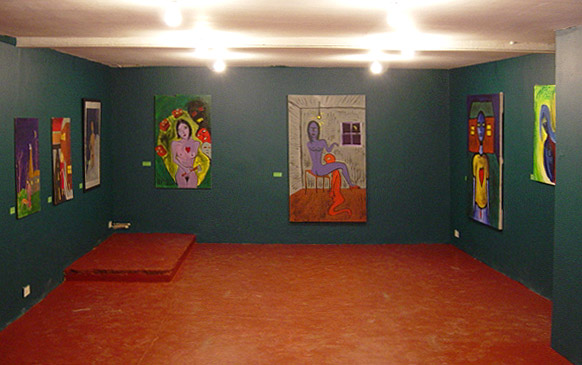
Stephen Howarth's show, I Don't Want a Painting Degree if It Means Not Painting, 2002, at the Stuckism International Gallery.

Howarth was then given the inaugural show at the Stuckism International Gallery in Shoreditch, with the title I Don't Want a Painting Degree if it Means Not Painting. He was in the first group show at the gallery, The Stuckists First International, and subsequent shows.

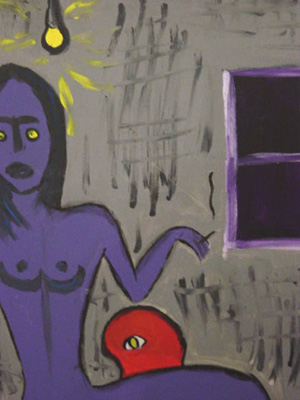
Stephen Howarth. Midnight in the hotel Suburbia (detail)

Sarah Kent in Time Out called his painting, Midnight in the hotel Suburbia, "soft porn". He responded that it was "hard porn".

After college he worked in a gallery, bar and factory, and as a labourer. He founded the Balham Stuckists group and also the South London Stuckism International Centre.

In 2001, he demonstrated with the Stuckists in Trafalgar Square during the unveiling of Rachel Whiteread's sculpture, Monument, and was in the Stuckist demonstration outside Tate Britain against the Turner Prize.

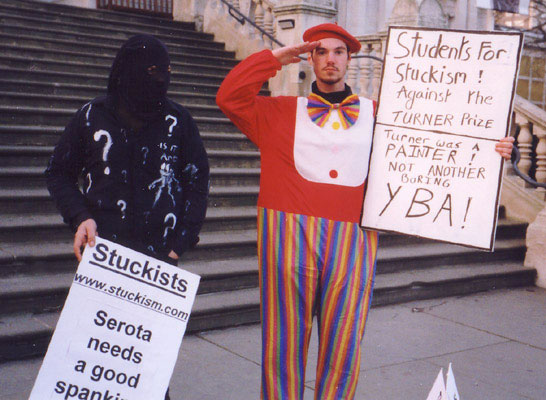
SP Howarth demonstrates against the Turner Prize in 2001

In 2003, he took part in a debate on Sky News with Richard Littlejohn about the £12,000 public funding given to artist Andre Stitt, who proposed to kick an empty takeaway container along Bedford High Street. Howarth's work was part of the donation of Stuckist paintings offered to the Tate Gallery in 2005, which the Tate rejected.

Group shows include Seven New Artists Pay Their Respects to Past Masters (2001) at the Fridge Gallery, Brixton; Umpapa (2001), Tap Collective, Clapham; Rivington Gallery Artists (2002), Rivington Gallery, Hoxton; Stuckism Group Show (2003), Wednesbury Museum, West Midlands; also at Black Spot, Clapham; Ace of Clubs, Clapham; Worthing Library; and Newcastle Arts Centre. He was in the first national museum show of the Stuckists, The Stuckists Punk Victorian, at the Walker Art Gallery during the 2004 Liverpool Biennial. Stella Vine, who was then a member of the Stuckists, bought one of his paintings at the Fridge Gallery.

He commented on his work:

It's a shameless obsession with sex and violence, because they're the physical manifestations of love and hate, which are the strongest emotions. It's analysing the theatre of conflict and erotica through the fantasies and daydreams of a proud outsider, who would be unable to relate to the 'real world' even if he wanted to.

He is not himself a violent person.

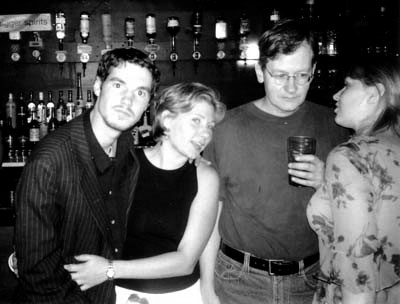
Vote Stuckist show, Brixton, London, 2001. Left to right: Stephen Howarth, friend, Charles Thomson, Stella Vine.

He is also a performance poet, and a Shortfuse Poetry Idol Competition winner. As well as a number of other slam titles including "Bard of Brixton." Is estimated to have performed at over a hundred venues in the U.S. and U.K. His publications of poetry are Poet, Painter, Pervert (Coffin Press) and Noteless Nocturnes to the Never-Ending Night (Coffin Press) (both, now out of print).

Howarth has worked as an actor in theatre productions, including Midsummer Night's Dream, A Comedy of Errors, and the rock musical Rasputin Rocks!, for which he was a co-writer with Andrew Hobbs, Lucyelle Cliffe and Alistair Smith. These were produced by Facsimile Productions. In the summer 2009 Howarth collaborated again with Andrew Hobbs of Facsimile Productions in writing a new play entitled Bacchus in Rehab. The play made its world premiere at the Etcetera Theatre in London, with Howarth cast in the title role and Anton Shelupanov in the role of Hades. Additionally Howarth co-wrote and starred in a short film, An Angry Young Man, and his poem A Brief History of south east England was used in a short film of the same name. Both can be seen on YouTube.

He has recently posed for a series of paintings by the artist Richard Bagguley.

== See also ==
- Classificatory disputes about art
- Conceptual art
