= Facsimile Productions =

Facsimile Productions is an independent London based theatre production company who stage productions of new writing by their own resident writers as well as others. They also produce tours for the British Touring Shakespeare Company. The company was founded in 2002 by Andrew Hobbs who was previously Associate Producer at the British Touring Shakespeare Company.

== Current Productions ==
The Woods are Lovely (2011) by Stephen Middleton

== Past Productions ==
- A Season Before The Tragedy of Macbeth (2010) by Gloria Carreño, Camden People's Theatre
- Bacchus In Rehab (2009) by Andrew Hobbs and S P Howarth, Etcetera Theatre
- Rasputin Rocks! (2008) by Andrew Hobbs and Alistair Smith (Henley Festival)
- A Midsummer Night's Dream (2008) UK Tour with British Touring Shakespeare
- The Comedy of Errors (2007) UK Tour with British Touring Shakespeare
- Romeo and Juliet (2006) UK Tour with British Touring Shakespeare
- The Tempest (2005) UK Tour with British Touring Shakespeare
- The Taming of the Shrew (2004) UK Tour with British Touring Shakespeare
- A Midsummer Night's Dream (2003) UK Tour and London season
- The Two Gentlemen of Verona (2003) UK Tour and London season

== Other projects ==
Facsimile Publications will shortly be publishing Stephen Howarth's poetry collection The Unprintable S P Howarth. Facsimile Records have a roster that includes Country Al and his Lonesome Guitar and the Scarecrow Project.

== Personnel ==
- Holly Berry – Associate Performer
- Una Buckley – Associate Director
- Emma Burn – Associate Performer
- Lucyelle Cliffe – Associate Producer and Casting Director
- Andrew Hobbs – Executive Producer, Artistic Director and Resident Writer
- Stephen Howarth – Resident Writer and Associate Producer
- Robert Paul – Associate Performer
- Anton Shelupanov – Executive Producer and Associate Performer
- Alistair Smith – Resident Composer
