= Bagley =

Bagley may refer to:

== Places ==
=== United Kingdom ===
- Bagley, Shrewsbury, England
- Bagley, Shropshire, England
- Bagley, Somerset, England
- Bagley, West Yorkshire, England
- Bagley Brook, in Shropshire, England
- Bagley Wood, in Oxfordshire, England

=== United States ===
- Bagley, Alabama
- Bagley, Iowa
- Bagley Township, Michigan
- Bagley, Minnesota
- Bagley, Wisconsin
- Bagley, Oconto County, Wisconsin
- Bagley, Utah - location of the Bagley train wreck

== Other uses ==
- Bagley (surname)
- Bagley Wright (1924–2011), American real estate developer and philanthropist
- Bagley-class destroyer
- USS Bagley, several ships by that name
- Bagley (Argentine company), a brand owned by Argentine food company Arcor
- Bagley's, a now closed London club venue
