= Eric Fitch Daglish =

English painter

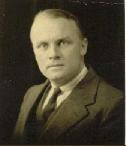
Eric Daglish

Eric Fitch Daglish (29 August 1892 – 5 April 1966) was a British engraver and author. He illustrated classics by Izaak Walton, Henry David Thoreau, Gilbert White and W. H. Hudson with wood engravings. Daglish also authored a number of natural history and wildlife/countryside books. Many of his books are now out of print but the originals are sold over the Internet.

He died in 1966. He is survived by two sons (twins) and one daughter from his first marriage to Alice Archer, and by one daughter and a son from his second marriage to Esther Lena Rutland. His son Stephen Daglish has conducted and published research on the tracing the origins of the Daglish family name.

== Selected works ==
A selection of books written by or illustrated by Eric Fitch Daglish:

- Fly Fishing by Viscount Grey of Fallodon (1930)
- The South Country, Edward Thomas and Eric Fitch Daglish (1932)
- A Nature Calendar (1932)
- A Week on the Concord and Merrimac Rivers, The Open Air Library by Henry Thoreau (1932)
- How To See Beasts (1933)
- How to See Flowers (1933)
- The Dog Owner's Guide (1933)
- The Gardener's Companion by Miles Hadfield (1938)
- The Lake Counties by W.G. Collingwood, A. Reginald Smith and Eric Fitch Daglish. (1939)
- Birds Of The British Isles (1948)
- The Dog Breeder's Manual (1951)
- Enjoying the Country (1952)
- Name this Insect (1960)
- The Beagle (1961)
- Pugs (1962)
- Dog Breeding and Management (1962; new ed., 1969)
- Whippets (1964)
