= Baguley (disambiguation) =

Baguley is an area of the city of Manchester in Wythenshawe, England.

Baguley may also refer to:

- Baguley (ward), Manchester, England
- Ernest E. Baguley (1863–1948), British engineer
- Baguley Cars Ltd, the original locomotive manufacturing company created by Ernest E. Baguley
- Baguley-Drewry, a locomotive manufacturer
- Baguley Hall
- Baguley railway station
- Baguley tram stop
- Baguley valve gear, a type of steam engine valve gear invented by Ernest E. Baguley

== See also ==
- Bagguley (surname)
