= Joseph Tom Burgess =

English journalist and writer

Joseph Tom Burgess (1828–1886) was an English journalist and writer, artist and antiquarian.

== Life ==
Born at Cheshunt in Hertfordshire on 17 February 1828, he was the son of a bookseller at Hinckley, by his wife who was from Leicestershire. He was educated at Hinckley at the school of Joseph Dare, and subsequently at the school of the Unitarian minister C. C. Nutter. While still young he became local correspondent of the Leicestershire Mercury, and then for a short time was in a solicitor's office in Northampton. In 1843 he was engaged as reporter on the staff of the Leicester Journal, and retained the post for eighteen months.

Burgess then became a wood engraver at Northampton, and for some years divided his attention between landscape painting, wood engraving, literature, and journalism. In 1848 he went to London, but returned to Northampton in 1850 to study the arts further. He was working at landscape painting, when he agreed to accompany David Alfred Doudney to Ireland to found a printing school at Bonmahon. Subsequently, he married and became editor of the Clare Journal for six years, distinguishing himself as a champion of industrial progress.

In 1857 Burgess moved to Bury, as editor of the Bury Guardian. Six years later he went to Swindon and became editor of the North Wilts Herald; but the Herald closed down the following year, and Burgess suffered a financial loss. He moved on to Leamington in April 1865, where for thirteen years he was editor of the Leamington Courier. In 1878 he accepted a better appointment as editor of Berrow's Worcester Journal and the Worcester Daily Times.

Five years later, in failing health, Burgess moved to London, where he spent three years, mainly in researches at the British Museum. He died in the Warneford Hospital, while on a visit to Leamington, on 4 October 1886. On 1 June 1876 he had been elected a fellow of the Society of Antiquaries of London.

== Works ==
Among other works Burgess was the author of:

- Life Scenes and Social Sketches, London, 1862.
- Angling: a Practical Guide to Bottom-fishing, Trolling, &c., London, 1867; revised by Robert Bright Marston, 1895.
- Old English Wild Flowers, London, 1868.
- Harry Hope's Holidays, London, 1871.
- The Last Battle of the Roses, Leamington, 1872.
- Historic Warwickshire, London, 1876; 2nd edit., with memoir by Joseph Hill, Birmingham, 1892–1893.
- Dominoes, and how to play them, London, 1877.
- A Handbook to Worcester Cathedral, London, 1884.
- Burgess, J. Tom (1884). Knots, ties and splices; a handbook for seafarers, travellers, and all who use cordage; with historical, heraldic, and practical notes. London: George Routledge and sons. OL 24176273M.

He also collected materials for a history of County Clare, with the title Land of the Dalcassians; the legendary part only was published.

== Family ==
Burgess was twice married: his second wife was Emma Daniell of Uppingham, whom he married in 1863.
