= Richard Bagguley =

English painter

Richard Bagguley (born 12 November 1955) is an international muralist and artist.

He spends much of the year traveling, dividing his time between on site commissions and his studio in London.

== Early life and education ==
Born 12 November 1955 in Shoreham by Sea. His parents, both actors, moved to Hampshire when he was 1 year old, his father worked as a television presenter at Southern Television. Bagguley was educated at Reed's School in Cobham Surrey, before studying photography at The Arts University College at Bournemouth followed by a brief spell as photographer and illustrator for The University of Hull magazine.

From 1976 he travelled through South America Asia and Australia drawing and photographing the people returning to London in 1985 to commence mural and Trompe-l'œil work.

== Murals ==
From 1988 London commissions included Arjun Waney and Lakshmi Mittal from the Asian community before attracting international commissions culminated by a six-year period in Istanbul working for Turkey's major industrial families including the chairmen of Doğuş Group and Koç Holding completing 450 private and commercial commissions in seven countries.

== Artistic career ==
In 2000 he started to work on canvas, painting a series on Tribal art for the River Nile gallery in Spain and portrait commissions in the UK. In 2002 he started on a new series of paintings topical social commentary social realism which formed the body of work first shown in the Chelsea Arts Club in March 2009. At the same time the documentary "Heaven, Hell and Bagguley" inspired by the contrast in the artists work was made by Max Thurlow, this and his latest body of work under the same title was shown at the Maverik showroom at the end of October 2009. In the same month Richard staged a modern crucifixion with performance artist Stephen Howarth as Jesus outside Oxford Circus underground station at rush hour.

The event was photographed by Andre Camara and reported on in newspapers including The Independent, The Telegraph and The Sunday Express. From those images Bagguley painted a 1.5 m x 2.5 m canvas with 40 people occupying the space. This brought him to the attention of the church followed by an article in The Baptist Times, the Reverend Dr. Brian Leathard invited him to put on an exhibition at St Luke's Church, Chelsea (29 October – 11 November 2010).

As artist in residence at St. Luke's Bagguley painted a contemporary portrait of Luke the Evangelist which is on permanent display at the church.

His method of using real people and events in his paintings falls under the label of Social Realism

== Portraits ==
Various, including John Milius on display at University of Southern California

Clifford Thurlow private collection, Roxana Valdivieso private collection.

Richard Bagguley is a member of:

- An Association of Professional Muralists – UK
- National Society of Mural Painters – USA
