= Paul Schullery =

American writer

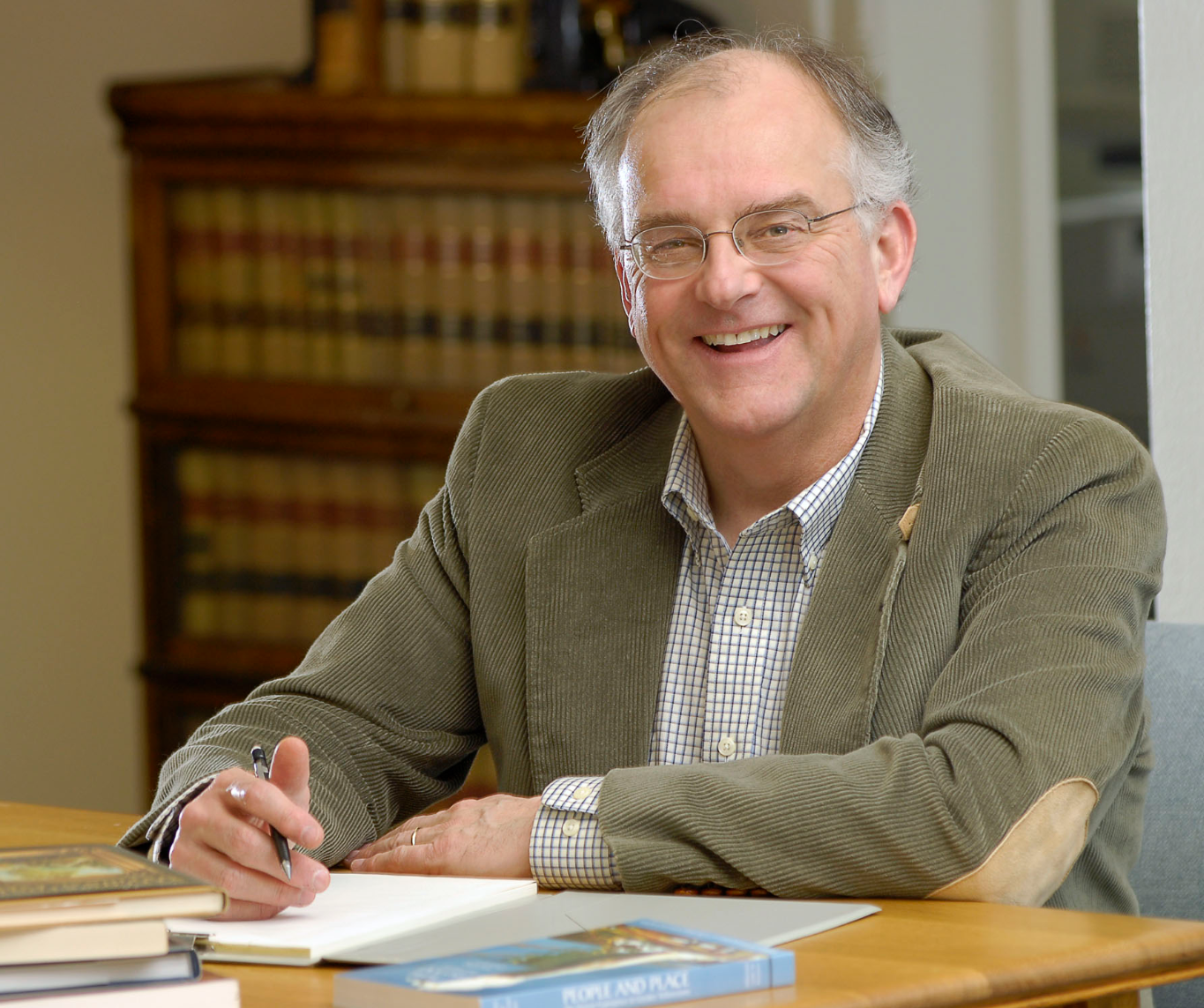
Paul Schullery in 2009

Paul Schullery was born in Middletown, Pennsylvania in 1948. He now lives in Bozeman, Montana. He has always been an avid hiker, fly fisher, photographer, wildlife watcher and has continuously documented his experience in his writing. Today, he is the author, co-author or editor of more than 40 books and numerous articles. His main focus for his works has to do with nature and our relationship with it as well as the wonders it presents us with now. Schullery studied American History at Wittenberg University and Ohio University, receiving his M.A. and B.A., respectively.

== Career ==
Beginning in 1972, Paul Schullery worked at Yellowstone National Park with a series of job responsibilities. Some of these responsibilities included ranger-naturalist, historian-archivist, environmental protection specialist, as well as senior editor in the Yellowstone Center for Resources, and chief of cultural resources. In an interview with Yellowstone Science, he tells how he was pretty clueless going into the job, and initially intended to become a park ranger, but then showed up to find that he was going to be a ranger-naturalist and would have to talk in front of people. He then went on to do research for Yellowstone and had access to all the Yellowstone Archives. His job was mainly to refine the collection, and find a way to draw attention to its importance. His work in Yellowstone ended in 2008 when he retired, but he still continues to write and publish his work. Alongside his work in Yellowstone and writing/editing, Schullery worked as the executive director of The American Museum of Fly Fishing in Manchester, Vermont from 1977 to 1982. He now works as an adjunct professor of American Studies and affiliate professor of history at University of Wyoming and Montana State University respectively. Since 2009, Schullery was recognized as scholar-in-residence at the Montana State University Library.

== Writing ==
Most of Schullery's writing pieces are based on the topics of nature or fly fishing. Some of the pieces he has written on nature include The Bears of Yellowstone, The Grand Canyon, American Bears, Mountain Time, Searching for Yellowstone, America's National Parks, Real Alaska, Lewis and Clark Among the Grizzlies, and This High, Wild Country. For his collection of works on fly fishing and its history on the culture, he was presented with the Roderick Haig-Brown Award. Some of the works considered in this decision were American Fly Fishing, Royal Coachman, Cowboy Trout, The Rise, If Fish Could Scream and Fly-Fishing Secrets of the Ancients. He has also written for all sorts of scholarly publications, for example Encyclopædia Britannica Yearbook of Science and The Future and Bioscience to The New York Times. In his last five publications he and his wife, artist Marsha Karle, have collaborated as author and illustrator. His writing has earned him a series of rewards including an honorary doctorate of letters from Montana State University, the Wallace Stegner Award from the University of Colorado Center of the American West, a Panda Award for scriptwriting from Wildscreen International and the Communications Award from the George Wright Society. Despite the fact that his main focus was on writing, he did experiment with a few screenwriting projects. One of the most noted ones was the 2002 PBS film "Yellowstone: America's Sacred Wilderness," which he wrote and narrated. For this piece, he was awarded with Wildscreen Internationals Panda Award for screenwriting.

== Impact ==
While working at Yellowstone as a historian, Schullery helped to draw attention to the importance of issues involved in the history of the park movement in America, and how they overlapped with what was going on at the time. He often spoke about pressing issues that involved Yellowstone and alerted the public. His main goals were to write educational stories that would better inform people about the place he loves. In fact, one of his books in particular Mark of the Bear was written to support a movement protecting North American bears. Not only did his writing help spread knowledge about Yellowstone, but he also contributed many books about fly fishing which were commonly written including in-depth information with regard to the sport. He wrote American Fly Fishing: A History which was intended to be a very informative story about the evolution of fly fishing. But the story itself actually included information with regard to different aspects of the sport. He included the use of certain flies, rods, reels and techniques. His writing style was both informative and educational yet fun and enjoyable. All in all, his writings about nature and fly fishing helped not only to expand public knowledge on the topics but also to spread the word about the sport and important issues altogether. Schullery has been an influential person with regard to the sport of fly fishing and Yellowstone National Park.
