= Thomas Baggallay =

English cricketer and solicitor

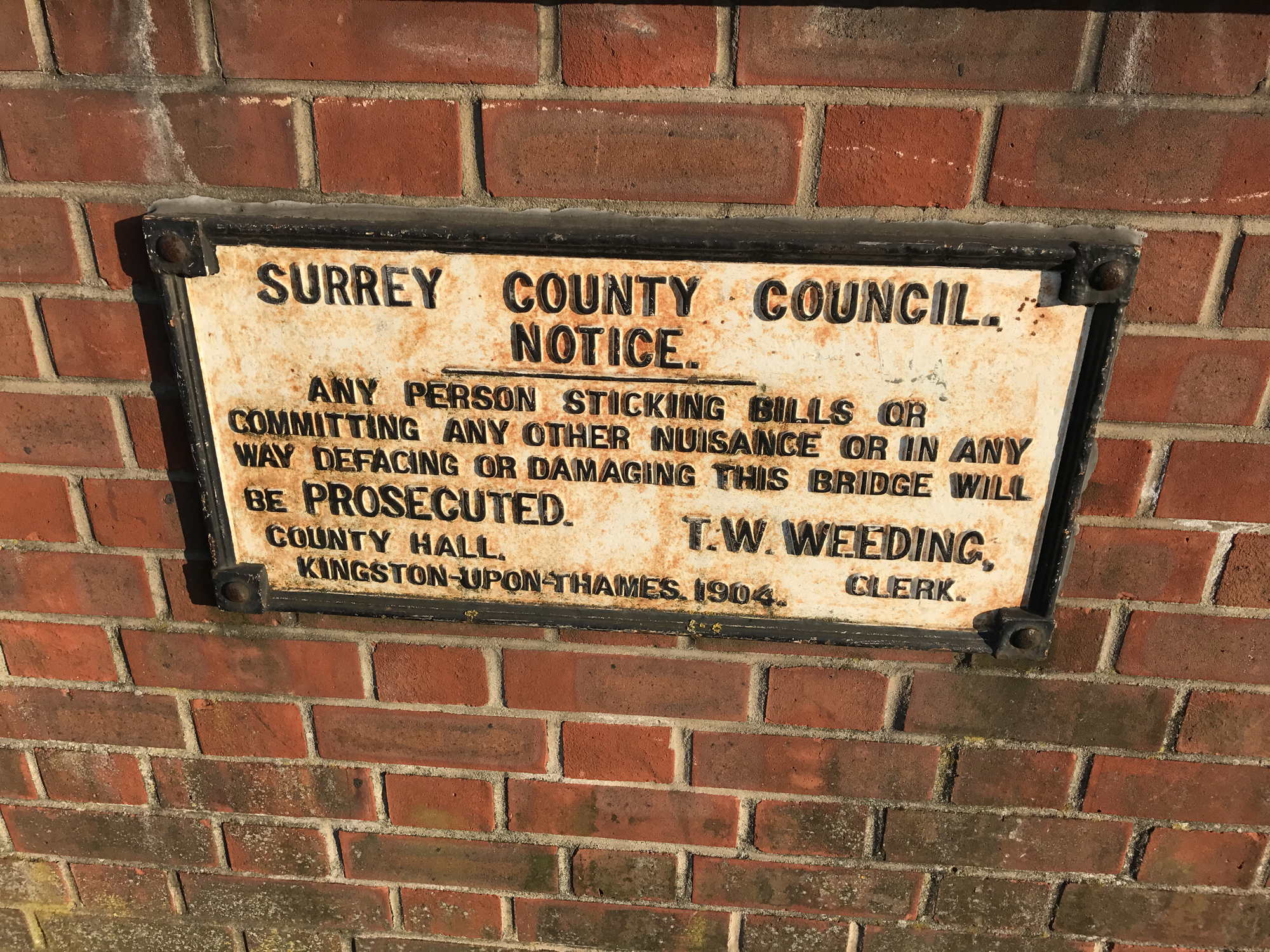
Later life: Baggallay/Weeding on a Surrey County Council sign, Mitcham Lane, London

Thomas Weeding Baggallay later Thomas Weeding Weeding (11 June 1847 – 19 December 1929) was a solicitor and an English first-class cricketer who played for Surrey as a wicketkeeper between 1865 and 1874. He was born in St Pancras, London and died in Addlestone, Surrey.

Baggallay changed his surname to Weeding in 1868 by royal licence. He qualified as a solicitor in 1870 and was Clerk to the Surrey County Council for more than thirty years. In 1927 he was appointed a Deputy-Lieutenant for the County of Surrey.

Baggalay married Alice Maude Elizabeth and had three sons, two of whom were killed during the First World War. Baggalay, died aged 82, following a fall from a chair on 19 December 1929 at Kingthorpe, Addlestone.
