= Herma Albertson Baggley =

American naturalist

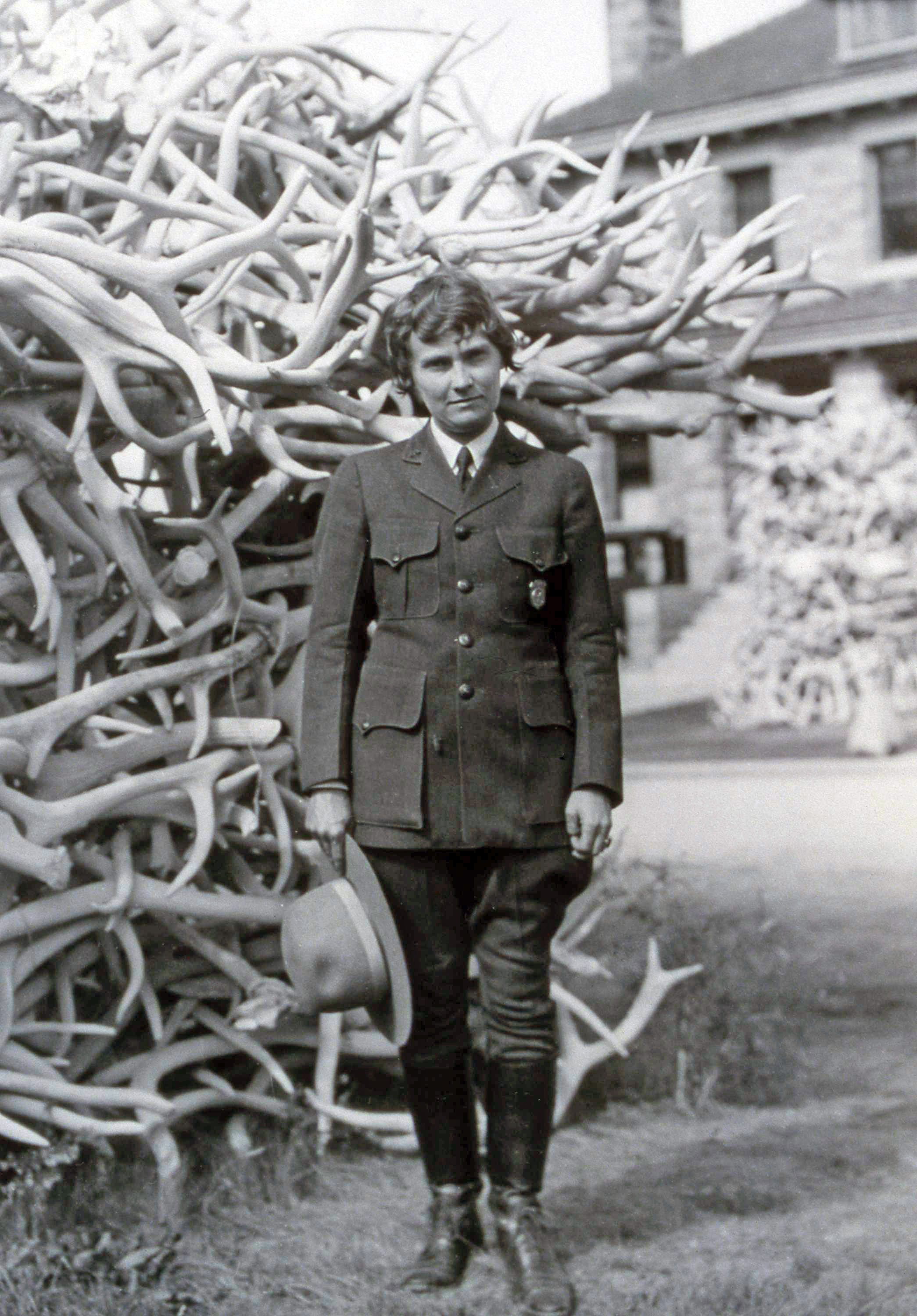
- Baggley at Mammoth Hot Springs Visitor Center Antlerhouse circa 1931
- Born: Herma Geneva Albertson; October 11, 1896; Inwood, Iowa, US
- Died: August 18, 1981 (aged 84)
- Education: University of Idaho
- Occupations: Naturalist, author, teacher
- Years active: 1924-1974
- Employer: National Park Service
- Notable work: Plants of Yellowstone National Park
- Spouse: George F. Baggley (m. 1931)
- Children: 1

Herma Albertson Baggley (October 11, 1896 – August 18, 1981) was an American park ranger, naturalist, author and teacher. In 1931, she became a full-time naturalist with the National Park Service at Yellowstone National Park, the first woman to hold the role. She co-authored Plants of Yellowstone National Park, published in 1936 and still in use as of 2019.

== Early life and career ==
Herma Geneva Albertson was born on October 11, 1896, in Inwood, Iowa. She lived in Iowa through the eighth grade, then moved to southern Idaho with her family for two years. In 1915, she graduated from high school in Blackfoot, Idaho and became an elementary school teacher for the Blackfoot School District.

In 1921, she enrolled at the University of Idaho, where she majored in botany and minored in philosophy. She returned to teaching for the 1922 to 1923 school year, but afterward resumed her studies and was elected to the Phi Beta Kappa and Sigma Xi honor societies. She then worked as a schoolteacher for a few years before returning to the University of Idaho for her master's degree. She graduated in 1929 and became an instructor at the University of Idaho. Over the next two summers, she worked as a seasonal employee at Old Faithful at Yellowstone National Park in 1929 and 1930, helping design the first trail to Old Faithful. She regularly delivered guided talks and lectures, sometimes drawing crowds of hundreds. In 1931, she was hired by the National Park Service as a full-time naturalist at Yellowstone, the first woman to hold the role.

Working for seven years in her naturalist position, she authored some twenty articles, and in 1936 co-authored, with Walter B. McDougal, Plants of Yellowstone National Park, traveling to Washington, D.C., to present the work at the United States Department of the Interior. A 1937 notice about the book said, "The great variety of wild flowers in this park is one of its chief charms, this is an illustrated account of them." Plants of Yellowstone has continued to be in print for decades; a 1973 notice said:

Don't let the title of this delightful book on wildflowers and other native plants mislead you, the scope of subject matter extends well beyond the Park boundaries. A wonderful reference whether you are hiking on the West Boulder or driving through Glacier National Park.

Baggley was also instrumental in improving living conditions for Park employees and their families, advocating that provision of improved housing and other benefits would help the park recruit better-qualified staff. Her work also encouraged the employment of more women in the NPS.

== Personal life ==
In 1931, she married George F. Baggley, who was Yellowstone's chief park ranger from 1929 to 1935. They had one daughter.

In 1968, they retired to Boise, where her brother lived, moving from Omaha, Nebraska. They had lived in Washington, D.C., and for two years in Jordan and Turkey, the two last while he was working on national parks for United States Agency for International Development.

Baggley died on August 18, 1981 in Boise.

== Legacy ==
The University of Idaho offers a scholarship in her name, the Herma Albertson Baggley Scholarship for undergraduates majoring in biological sciences. Colorado State University's George F. and Herma A. Baggley Graduate Scholarship supports those pursuing careers in forestry, wildlife and natural resources. Her papers are held at the Yellowstone Heritage and Resource Center in Gardiner, Montana. As of 2019, her book Plants of Yellowstone National Park was still in use.
