= Mervyn Baggallay =

English cricketer

Personal information
- Born: 7 December 1887; Kensington, London
- Died: 19 March 1961 (aged 73); Kensington, London
- Source: Cricinfo, 1 April 2017

Mervyn Baggallay (7 December 1887 – 19 March 1961) was an English cricketer. He played eight first-class matches for Cambridge University Cricket Club in 1911.

== See also ==
- List of Cambridge University Cricket Club players
