= Wulff series of dry flies =

- Artificial fly
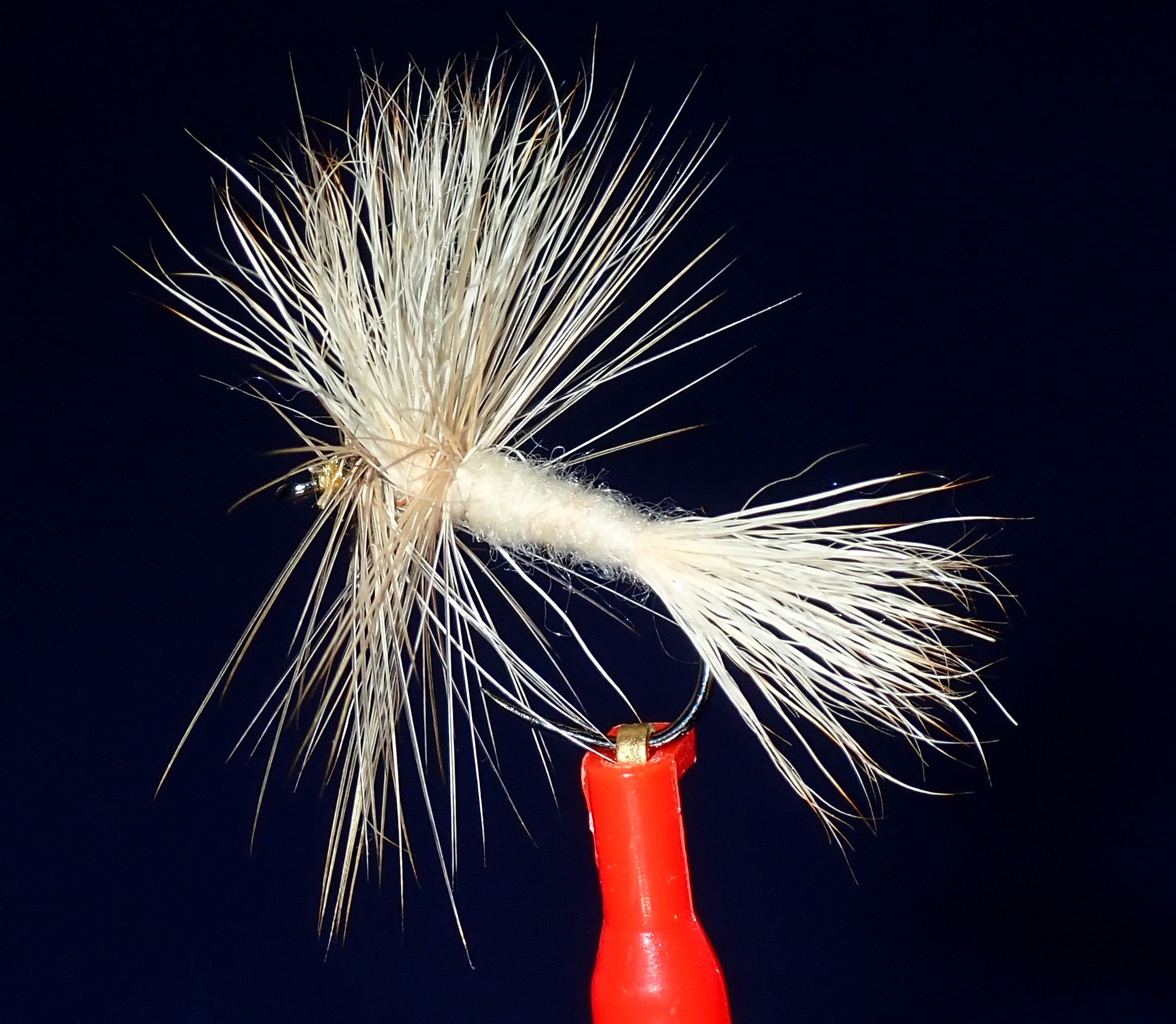
- Blond Wulff
- Type: Dry fly
- Imitates: Adult mayflies

History
- Creator: Lee Wulff

Materials
- Typical sizes: 8-18 standard dry fly
- Typical hooks: TMC 100, Firehole 419
- Thread: 6/0, 8/0
- Tail: Bucktail, deer, moose
- Body: Fur or synthetic dubing
- Wing: Bucktail, deer, moose, calf tail
- Hackle: Dry fly hackle

Uses
- Primary use: Trout, Salmon

The Wulff series of dry flies evolved from a dry fly style conceived by angler Lee Wulff in the 1930s.

== Origin ==
In 1930, Lee Wulff designed three innovative dry flies to use when fishing on the Esopus and other Catskill rivers. He called the flies the Ausable Gray, Coffin May and Bucktail Coachman. High-floating, full-bodied flies with hair wings and tails, they proved exceptionally effective for trout and salmon in fast rivers. At the time, Wulff was fishing regularly with Dan Bailey, a science teacher at Brooklyn Polytechnic. Both men were tying and selling flies in their spare time to supplement their incomes. Wulff considered the traditional English and Catskill style dry flies (the staple of the fly trade) far too skinny and "anemic" to be effective for American trout, thus he created this stocky, robust style of fly. Angling author Joseph D. Bates Jr. in his seminal work on Atlantic Salmon Flies and Fishing (1970) credits Wulff with "establishing a distinct American style of dry fly".

Wulff collaborated with Bailey during the development of the patterns, and Bailey encouraged him to rename the flies. The original Ausable Gray, Coffin May and Bucktail Coachman became the Grey Wulff, White Wulff and Royal Wulff. Three additional patterns were created by the end of 1930: the Blonde Wulff, Brown Wulff and Black Wulff. The series gained prominence after Wulff introduced them to Ray Bergman, another fly angler and outdoor writer who became the Fishing editor for Outdoor Life magazine. Bergman embraced the flies and included them in his two editions of Trout magazine (1938, 1952).

The Wulff flies were designed by Lee Wulff and fill a decided need in large sizes. I consider them necessary to the well-balanced fly box. New Wulff patterns, Black Wulff and Grizzly Wulff [designed by Dan Bailey] have been added to my color plates because they are considered very important by fishermen in the Rockies as well as other sections.

— Ray Bergman, Trout (1952)

Considering the pattern somewhat generic, Wulff encouraged variation and evolution of the pattern instead of rigid adherence to a precise recipe. Bailey, who fished regularly in Montana and eventually established a fly shop and mail order business in Livingston, Montana in 1938, promoted the series extensively to western fly anglers. The Wulff flies, especially the Royal Wulff, remain a staple in anglers' fly boxes around the world. Angler and writer John Gierach believed the Royal Wulff to be one of the most popular dry patterns of the second half of the twentieth century.

== Imitates ==
Originally tied to imitate large mayflies, the Wulff style flies are also useful to imitate adult grasshoppers and other large terrestrial insects.

== Materials ==
- Hook-dry fly hook (size 8-18)
- Thread-color matching specific Wulff pattern
- Hackle-dry fly hackle matching specific Wulff pattern
- Tail-Bucktail, deer or moose hair, calf tail tied full
- Body-wool, fur or synthetic dubbing color matching specific Wulff pattern
- Wing-Bucktail, deer hair, calf tail

== Variations ==
As described by Dave Hughes in Trout Flies – The Tier's Reference unless attributed otherwise.

- Adams Wulff – patterned after the Adams dry fly with a gray muskrat fur body and mixed grizzly and brown hackle
- Ausable Wulff – distinguished by a rusty orange fur body, white wings and mixed grizzly and brown hackle
- Black Wulff – distinguished by a pink fur body, black wings and furnace hackle
- Blonde Wulff – distinguished by a tan fur body, light colored tail and wings, ginger hackle
- Brown Wulff
- Brown Drake Wulff – variations attributed to Dan Bailey (1960s), Mike Lawson (1970s) and Bruce Staples (1990s)
- Gray Wulff – distinguished by dark brown body fur, wings and medium dun hackle
- Green Drake Wulff – attributed to Bob Jacklin, light olive body, grizzly dyed yellow hackle
- Grizzly Wulff – distinguished by a yellow floss or fur body, brown wings and tail and mixed brown and grizzly hackle
- Montana Wulff – attributed to Allen Knox (1960s)
- Royal Wulff – a Wulff style derived from the Royal Coachman
- Were Wulff – attributed to Gary LaFontaine, body of hare's ear dubbing
- White Wulff
- Wolf Wulff – attributed to LeRoy Cook (1978), distinguished by a body, wing and tail of wolf fur and hair
Wulff Series of Dry Flies
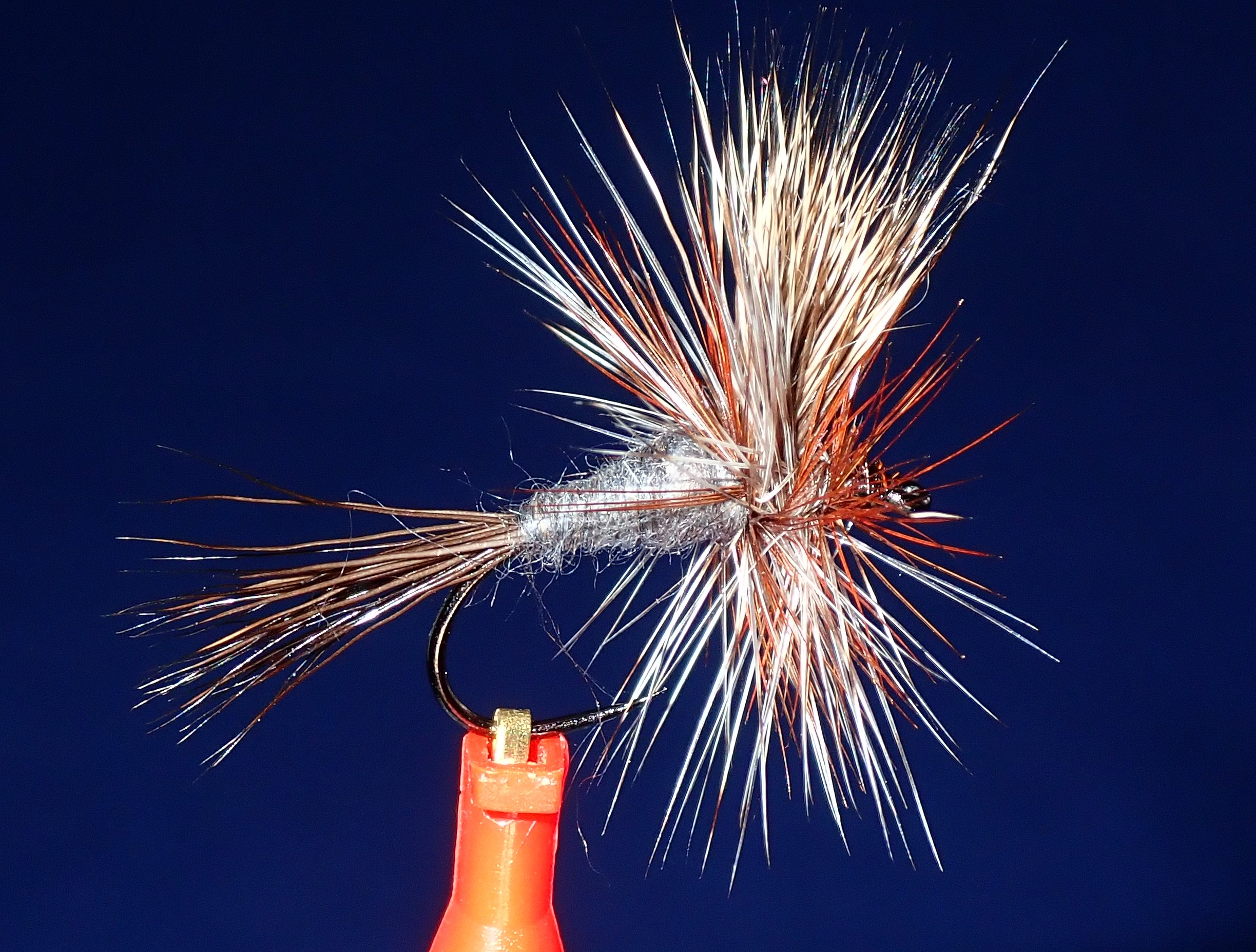
Adams Wulff

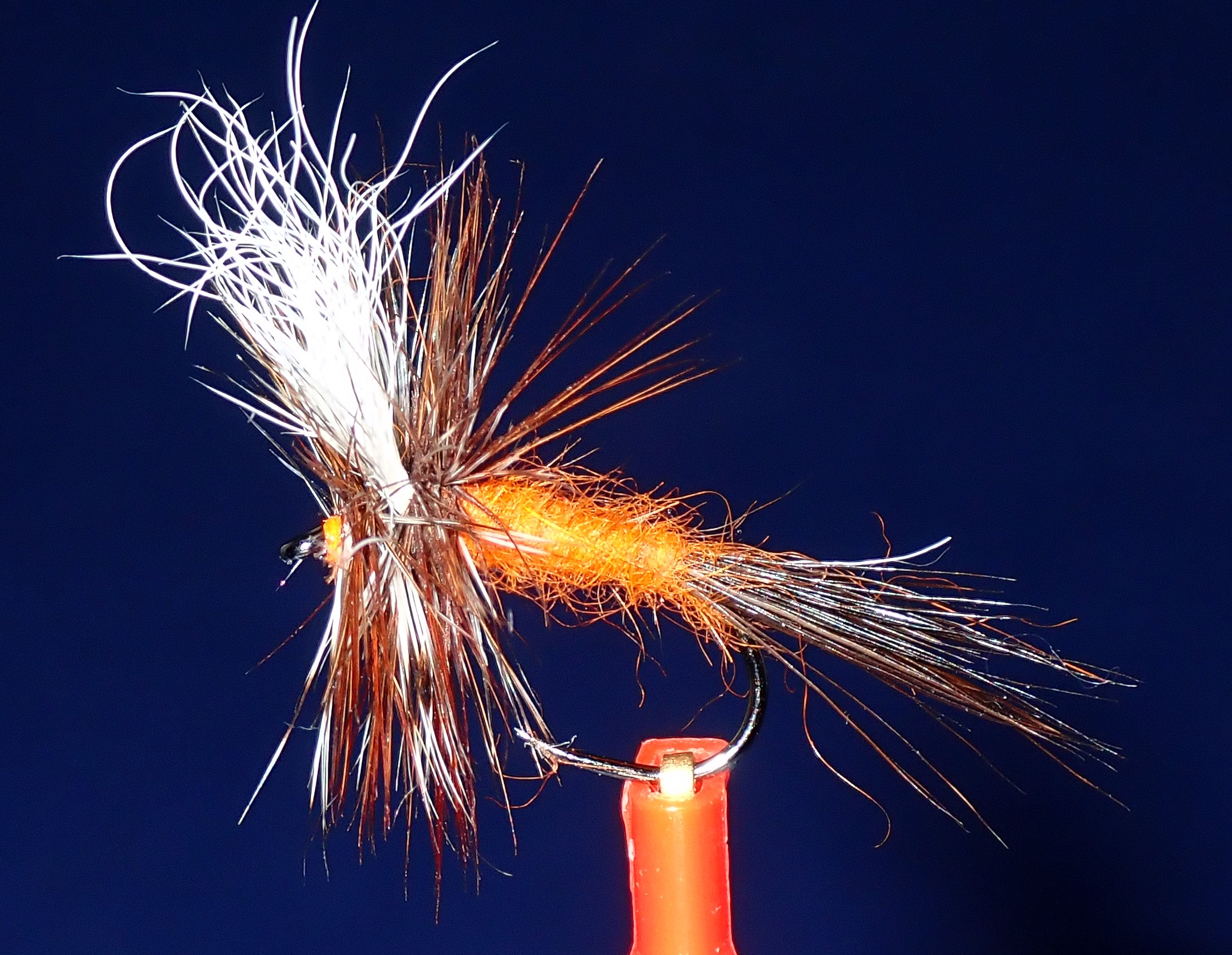
Ausable Wulff

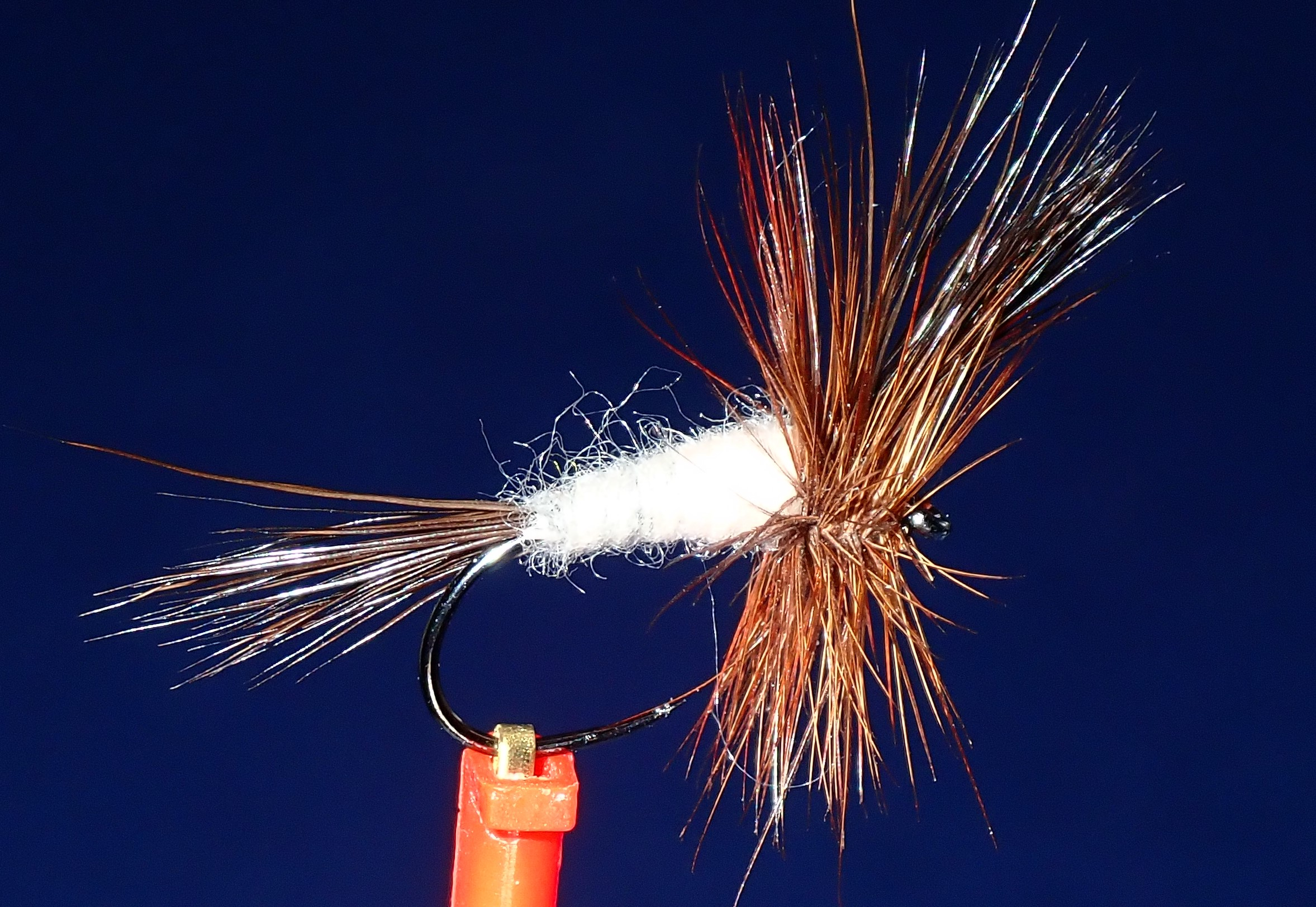
Black Wulff

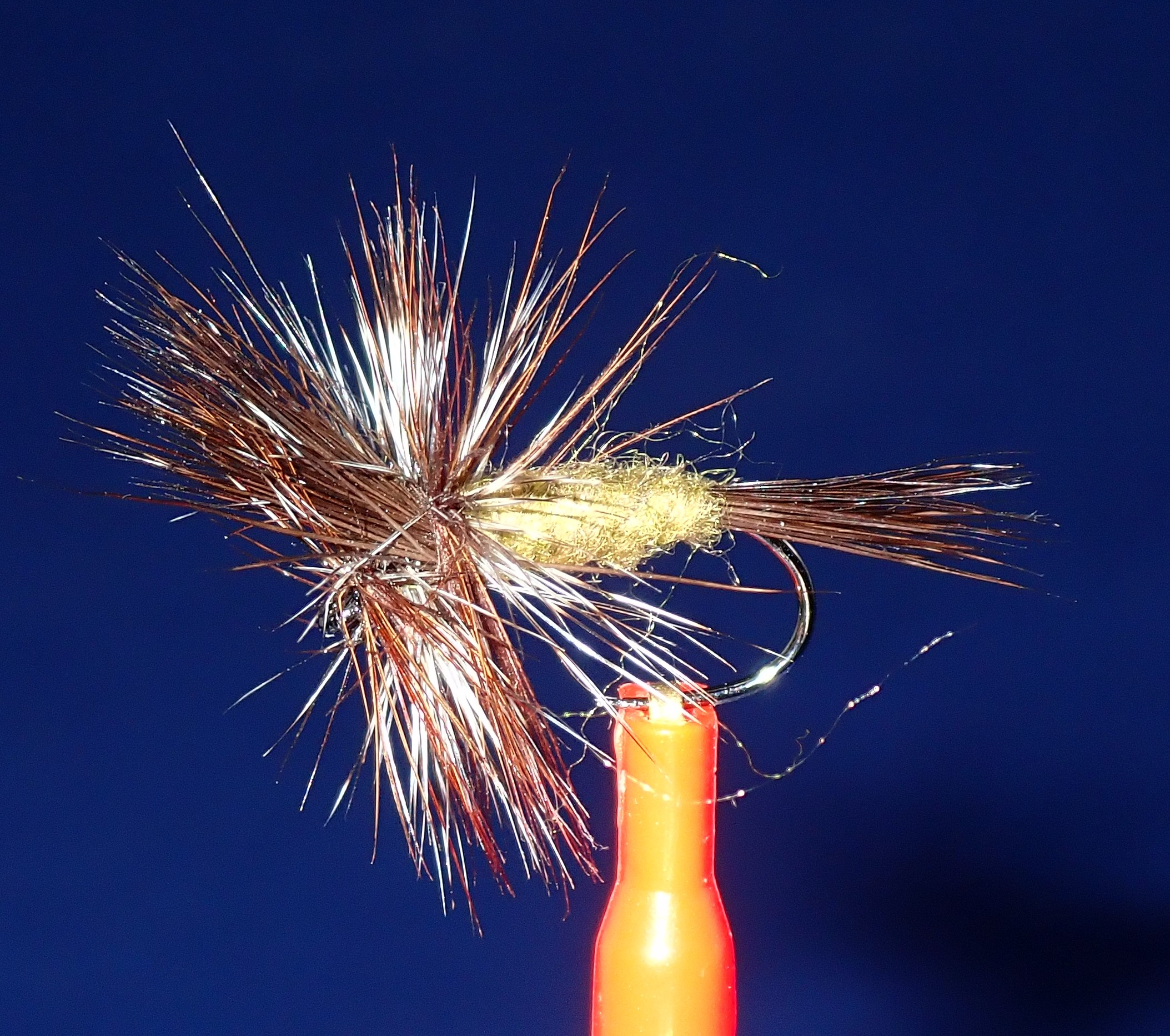
Montana Wulff

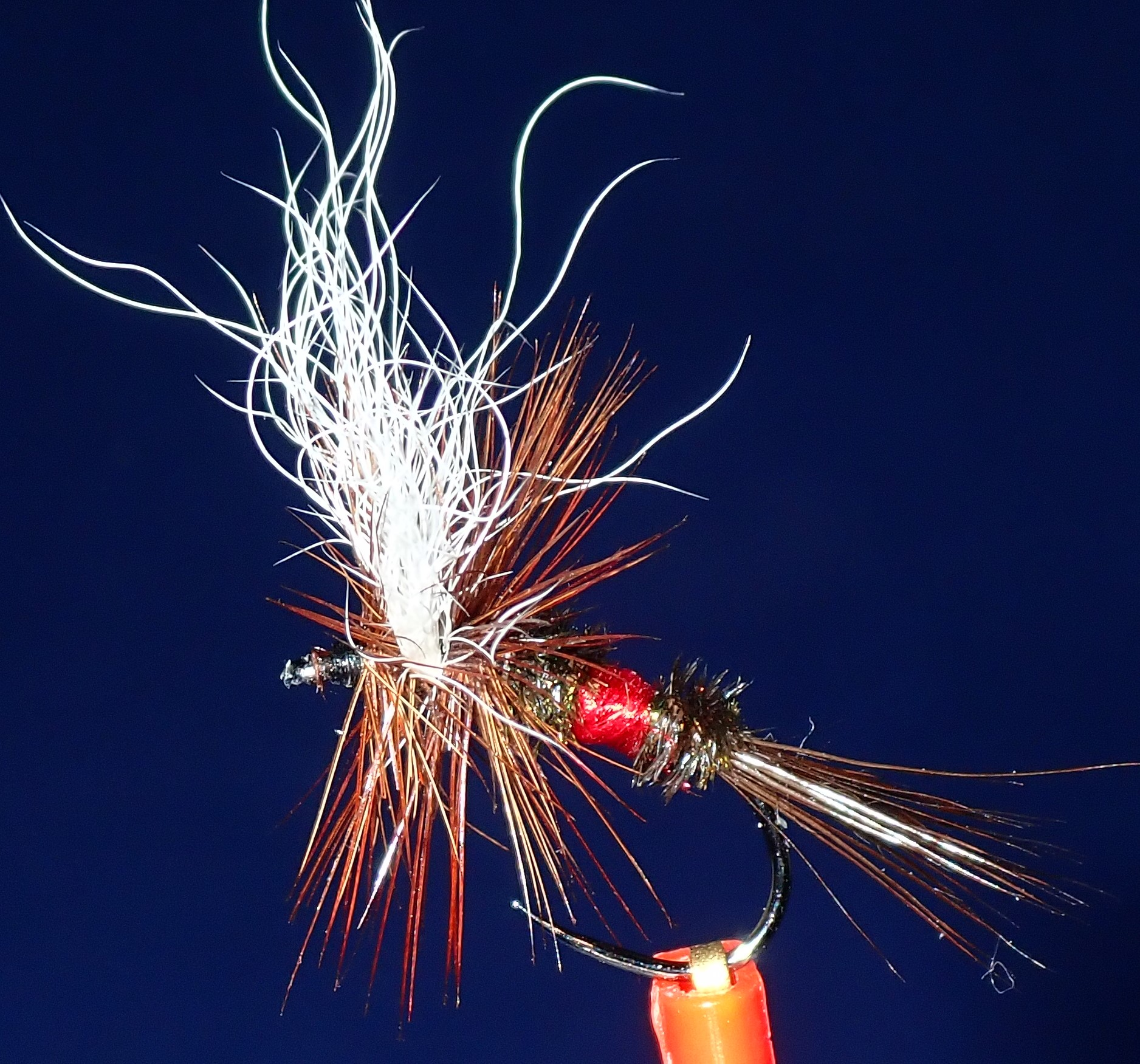
Royal Wulff

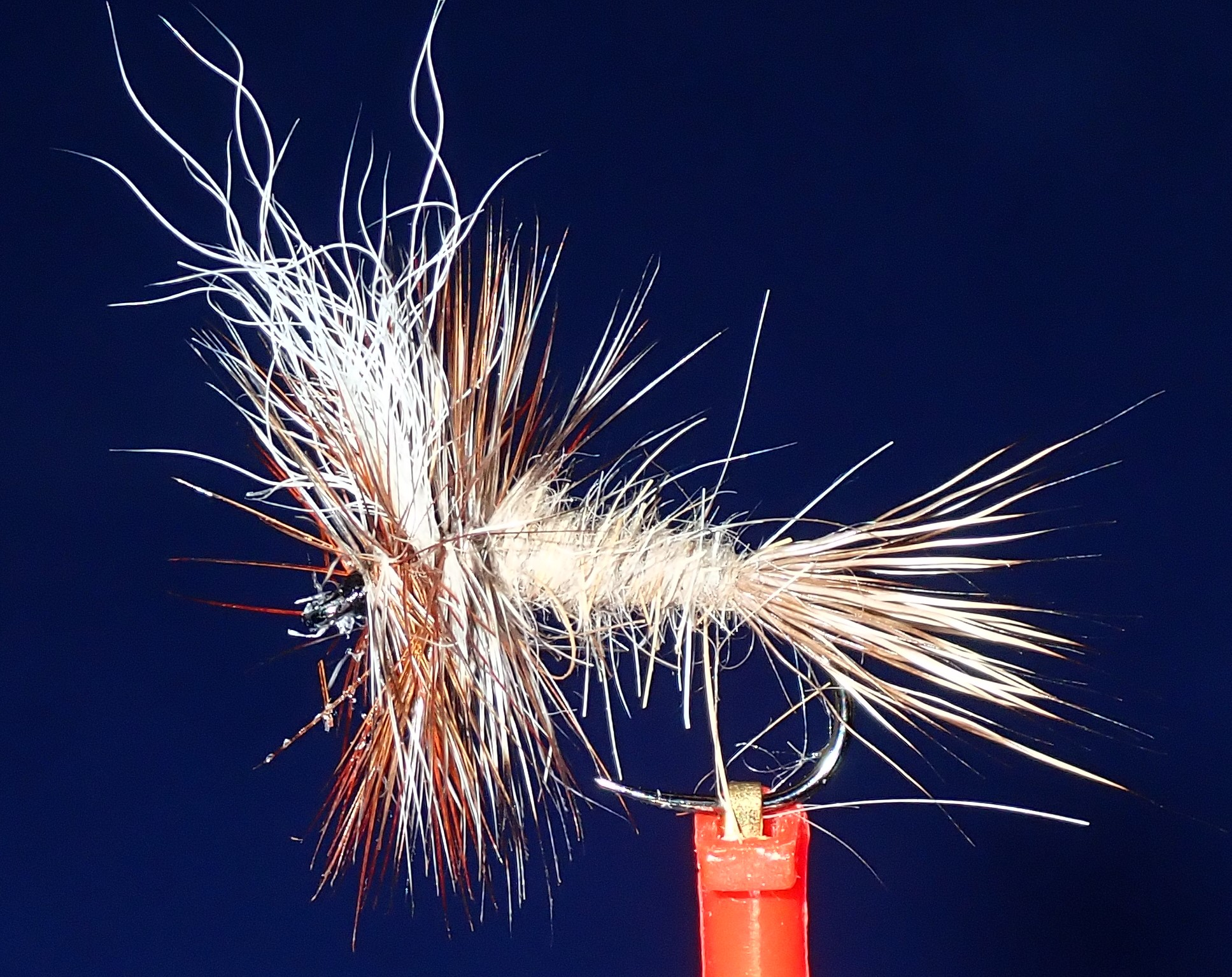
Were Wulff

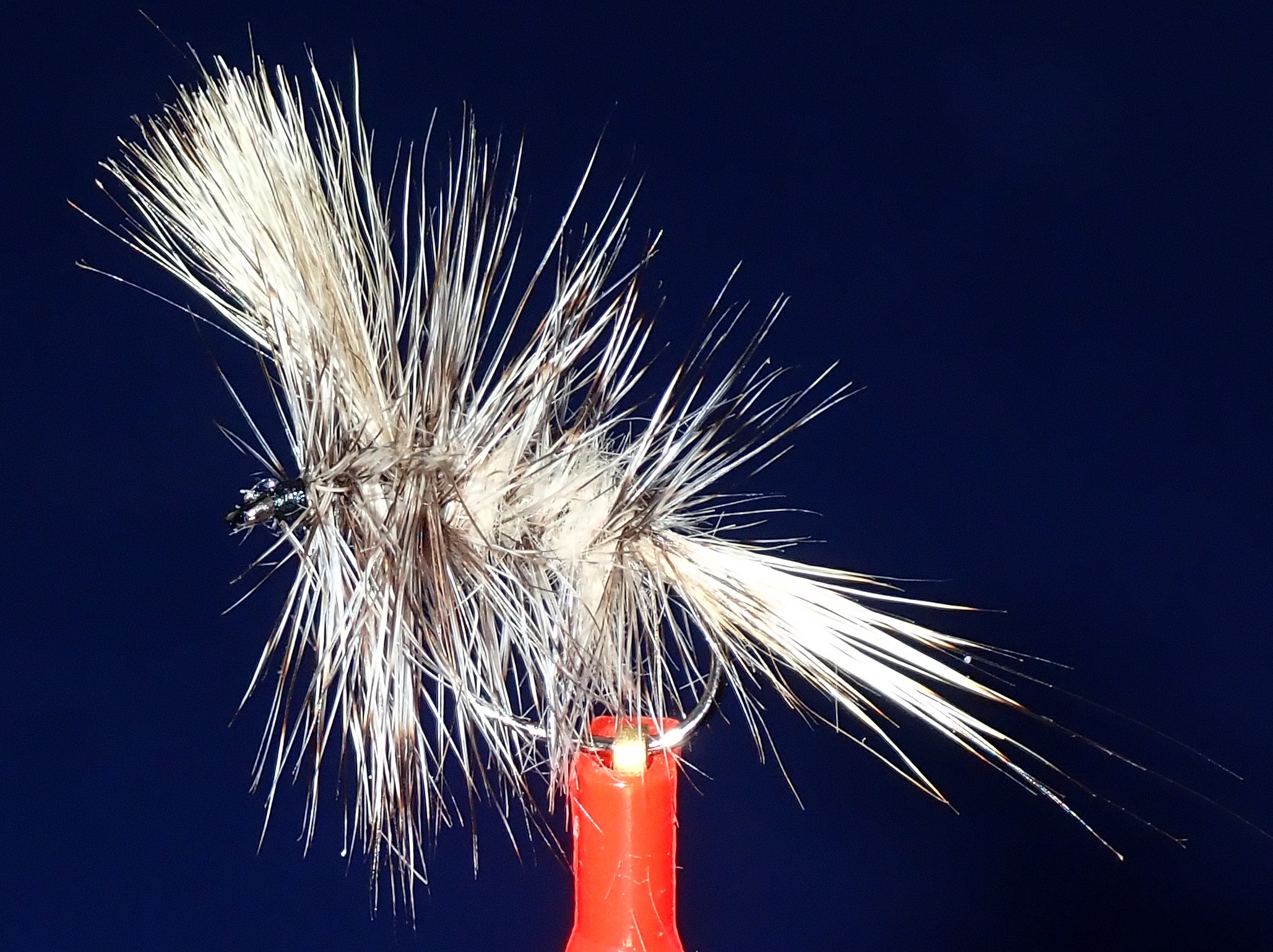
Wolf Wulff
