= Fly Casting Analyzer =

Analysis device for fly fishing

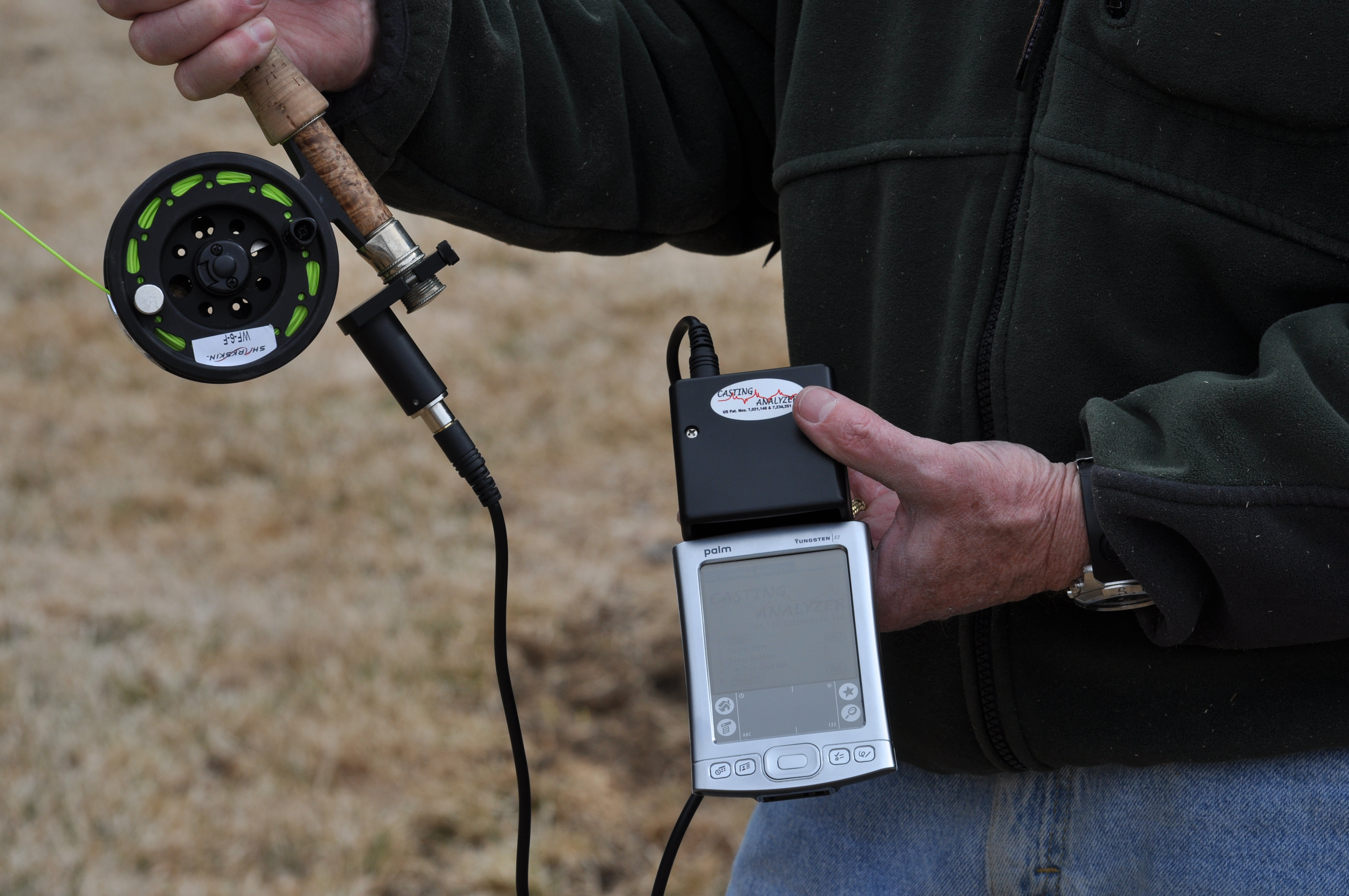
- Fly Casting Analyzer
- Uses: Analysis of casting stroke
- Used with: Fly rod
- Inventor: Noel Perkins and Bruce Richards
- Related: Fly Fishing

The Fly Casting Analyzer is a research tool for understanding fly casting, developed in 2003 by Bruce Richards of Scientific Anglers and Noel Perkins, a professor of engineering at the University of Michigan.

The Fly Casting Analyzer is a unique system that measures the casting stroke of an individual casting a fly line with a fly rod. A sensor attached to the reel seat measures your rod speed and a Palm pilot (or Palm cell phone) then records the casting signature. A Palm application immediately analyzes the casting signature by breaking it down into its major parts. By systematically measuring and analyzing fly rod motions that cannot easily be resolved by eye, the Fly Casting Analyzer provides new capabilities for teaching and learning fly casting.

== How it works ==
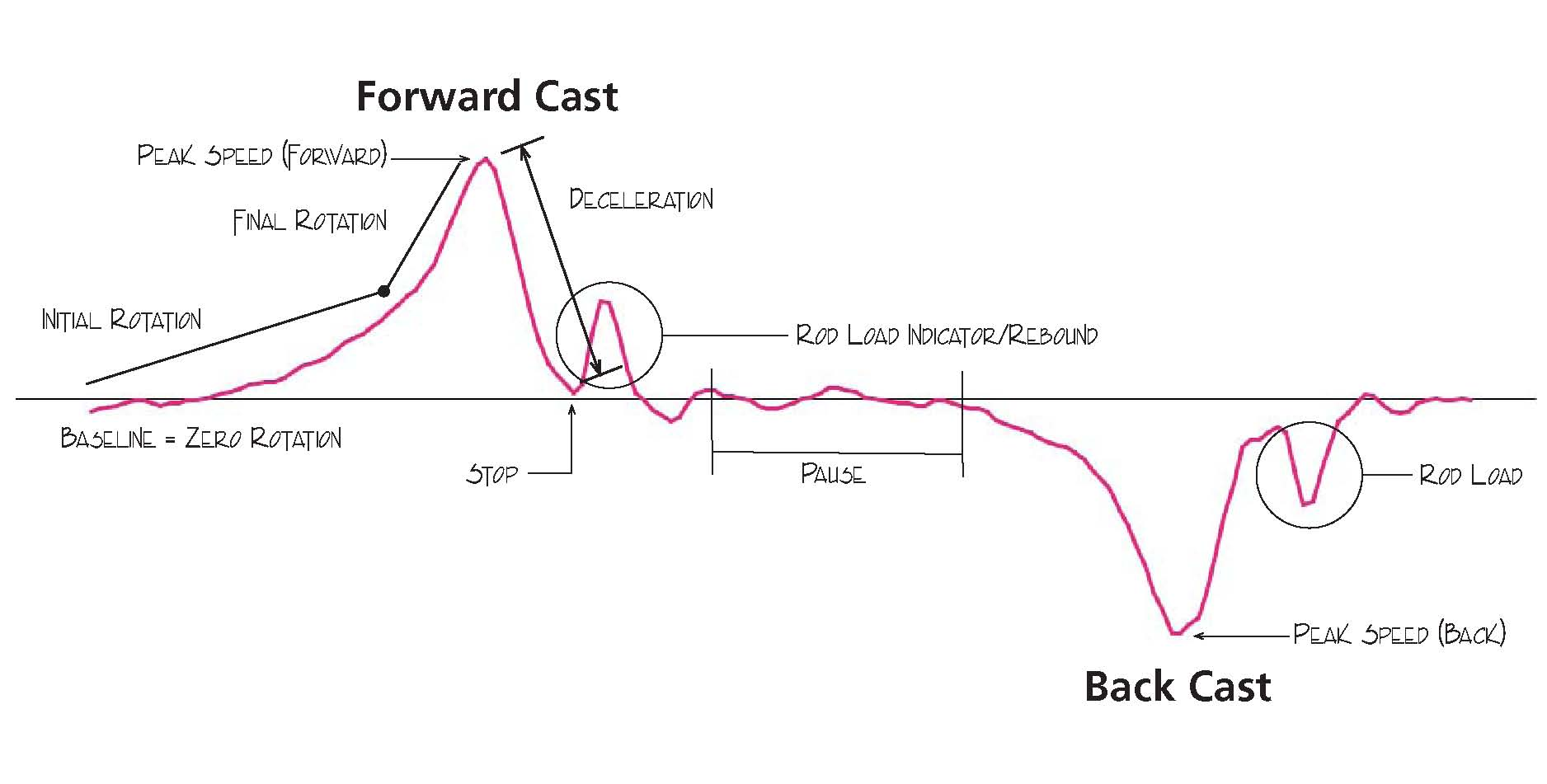
Complete casting signature

The analyzer measures the most important part of a fly cast, rod rotation, which is the rod angle change during casting. This is the only motion that is necessary to make a fly cast. How the rod rotates, acceleration, speed, deceleration largely determine the quality of a cast. If this motion isn't done well, an efficient, effective cast cannot be made.

A small rate gyro is enclosed in a capsule that is attached to the fly rod. Rate gyros measure angular rotation. The signal from the rate gyro is transferred via cable to a small data collection box that is held or clipped to the caster or instructor. A Palm Pilot is attached to the box and data collected in transferred to the Palm via infrared beaming. The proprietary software installed on the Palm crunches the data, turning it into a casting signature that reveals many things about rod rotation.

== Commercialized ==
In 2005, Richards and Perkins commercialized the Fly Casting Analyzer with the formation of Castanalysis, LLC in partnership with Sage Fly Fishing. In 2005, Noel Perkins won the ispo-TUM Academic Challenge Award for the Fly Casting Analyzer. In 2006, the Fly Casting Analyzer was awarded an Editor's Choice Award by Fly Fish America.

Images from the Fly Casting Analyzer Software
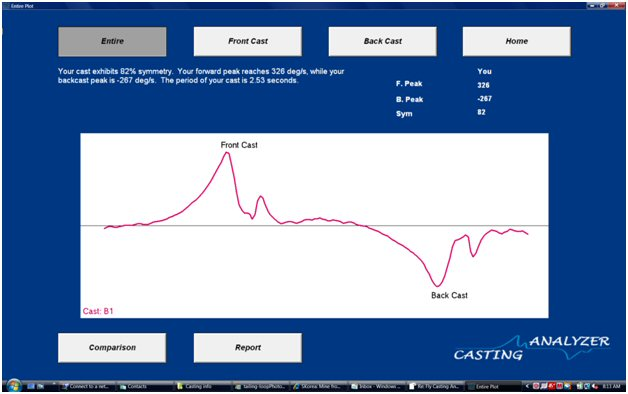
Entire cast

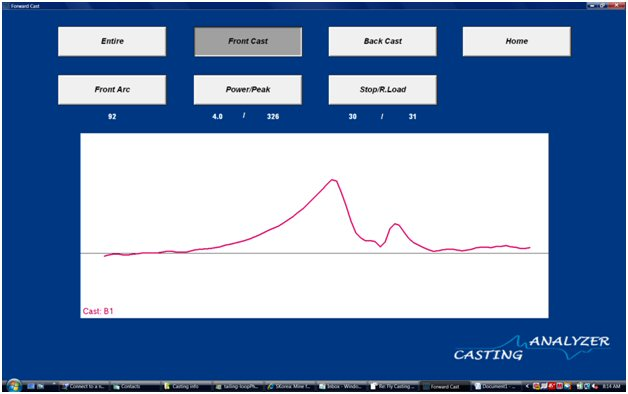
Front cast

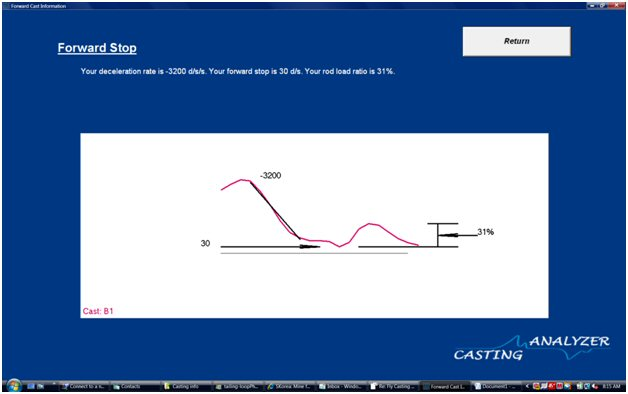
Forward stop

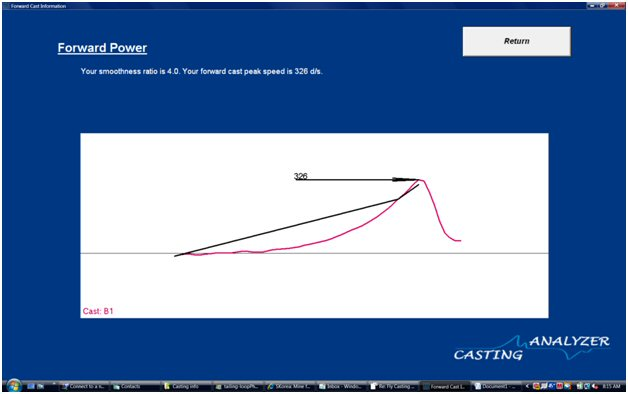
Forward power

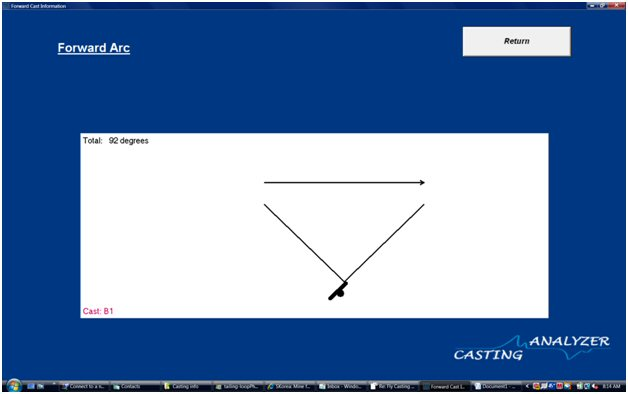
Forward arc

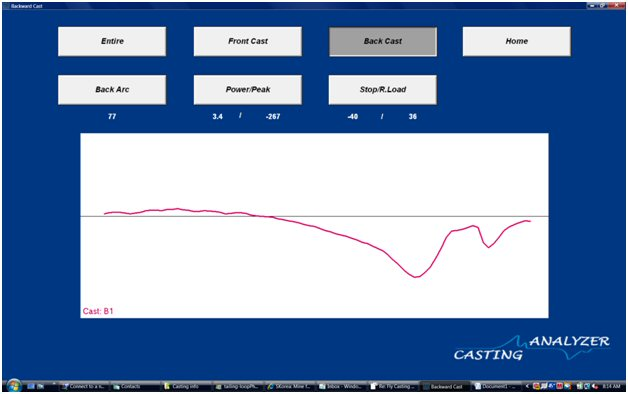
Back cast

== See also ==
- Federation of Fly Fishers
- Casting (fishing)
- Fly rod
