= Fly Fishers International =

Non-profit organization

- Formation: June 1965
- Type: 501(c)(3)
- Purpose: Fishing
- Headquarters: Livingston, Montana, United States
- Region served: International
- Website: http://www.flyfishersinternational.org

Fly Fishers International (FFI) is an international 501(c)(3) non-profit organization headquartered in Livingston, Montana. It was founded in 1964 and formalized a year later in 1965. FFI is an organized voice for fly fishers around the world; they represent aspects of fly fishing, which include the art of fly tying, casting, and protection of the natural systems that support healthy fisheries and their habitats.

== Origins ==
In April 1964, the McKenzie River Flyfishers was organized in Eugene, Oregon with the expressed goal of forming a national fly fishing organization. A gathering of prominent fly fishermen from the West Coast of the United States and Gene Anderegg of the Theodore Gordon Flyfishers of New York City occurred in September 1964 in Aspen, Colorado. Gene Anderegg orchestrated a correspondence among many fly fishing clubs, aided by the support of angling notables Lee Wulff and Ed Zern, that resulted in the first conclave being held in June 1965. All the original clubs were from California, Oregon and Washington, except the Theodore Gordon Flyfishers.

It occurs to me that a loose federation of fly fishing groups could be of considerable value

— letter from Lee Wulff to Bob Wethern of the Flyfishers Club of Oregon May 27, 1964

The Federation was first organized as the Federation of Fly Fishermen but the name changed to its current status in the early 1980s. By 1974 there were 120 clubs and over 7,000 members across the United States in the Federation.

Lew Bell and Lee Wulff drafted the original constitution for the Federation and its preamble read:

We, in conclave assembled, out of a firm and abiding conviction that fly fishing as a way of angling gives its follows the finest form of outdoor recreation and natural understanding, do hereby join in common effort in order to maintain and further fly fishing as a sport, and, through it, to promote and conserve angling resources, inspire angling literature, advance the brotherhood of angling and broaden the understanding of all anglers in the spirit of true sportsmanship

— Preamble to the Constitution of the Federation of Fly Fishermen, 1965

== Programs ==
=== Annual Awards ===
Fly Fishers International Awards Program was established to recognize those individuals, clubs, and other organizations that have made outstanding contributions to the environment, fishery resources, angling literature, the fly tackle industry, and the Federation. (year established)

- Man of the Year (1966) - An award presented annually to that individual or director who has demonstrated unusual devotion to the Federation, and through outstanding contributions has benefited the Federation as a National or international organization
- Woman of the Year (1985) - An award presented annually to that individual or director who has demonstrated unusual devotion to the Federation, and through outstanding contributions has benefited the Federation as a National or international organization
- Order of the Lapis Lazuli (1970) - The ultimate award of the Federation, and is in recognition of services and contributions to the Federation that have been prominent and extraordinary, over many years
- McKenzie Cup (1967) - A rotating award, given annually to that Federation Club which has made an outstanding contribution on behalf of the Federation
- Buz Buszek Memorial Award (1970) - An award plaque presented annually to that person who has made significant contributions to the arts of fly tying
- Dick Nelson Fly Tying Teaching Award (2000) - This award is to be presented to an individual who excels in teaching the art of fly-tying to tiers at all skill levels.
- Ambassador Award (1984) - Presented annually to the fly fisher who meets certain high standards of sportsmanship, fishing skill and streamside etiquette in taking and conserving game fish internationally
- Lee Wulff Award (1990) - An award that recognizes a manufacturer or a retail business that demonstrates outstanding innovation in the fly fishing industry through their products and outstanding stewardship for water and fisheries resources.
- Roderick Haig-Brown Award (1991) - The award recognizes a fly fishing author whose work embodies the philosophy and spirit of Roderick Haig-Brown, particularly, a respect for the ethics and traditions of fly fishing and an understanding of rivers, the inhabitants and their environments.
- Silver King Award (1994) - This Federation saltwater award is named after the highly prized saltwater trophy, the Tarpon. It is presented to an individual who has made extraordinary contributions to the sport of saltwater angling over an extended period.
- Conservation Award (1978) - Awarded to an individual, group or organization which has made extraordinary contributions to the conservation of our fisheries resources in the past year.
- Leopold Award (2001) - A person who is honored for a lifetime of fisheries conservation effort and work
- Robert J. Marriott's Scholarship
- J. Stanley Lloyd Conservation Award (1992) - A financial grant for a Federation club working on a current or future project related to fishery conservation enhancement and preservation. Matching funds are required and may be on an in-kind basis.
- Dr. James Henshall Warmwater Fisheries Award (1985) - An award to an individual contributing to warmwater fly fishing and fisheries in memory of Dr. James A. Henshall, a 19th-century author and early advocate for bass as a gamefish.
- Memorial Life Awards - The Memorial Life Membership Award program provides a Federation lifetime membership in the name of an individual who has contributed significantly to fly fishing. Four funds have been established to support these life membership memorials.
  - Don Harger Memorial Life Award (1978)
  - Arnold Gingrich Memorial Life Award (1978)
  - Lew Jewett Memorial Life Award (1979)
  - Charles Brooks Memorial Life Award (1987)
- Lifetime Achievement in Fly Casting Instruction Award (2005) - An award given by the Board of Governors of the Federation Casting Instructor Program in recognition of those who have made significant contributions to the art of fly casting instruction.
- Mel Krieger Fly Casting Instructor's Award (2007) - An award given by the Board of Governors of the Federation Casting Instructor Program in recognition of those who have made significant contributions to the Federation Casting Instructor Certification Program, have dedicated themselves to fly casting instruction and have shared their knowledge with others.

=== Annual Conclave ===
The Federation has held an Annual Fly Fishing Fair and Conclave since 1965. The Fly Fishing Fair and Conclave is the Federation's annual education and fundraising event. The Fair offers workshops, programs, and demonstrations on fly tying, fly casting, fly fishing tactics, aquatic entomology, fly rod building, angling ethics, water safety, and other related topics. Anglers and fly fishing experts from around the world attend to support Youth and Women's programs, conservation and education forums, photo contests, and author book signings.

=== Certified Casting Instructor Program ===
In 1992, the Federation established the Certified Casting Instructor program to enhance the sport of fly fishing in three important areas:

1. To educate fly casting instructors
2. To establish communication between instructors
3. To offer learners a more accepted entry into our sport and a more qualified group of instructors.

Noted fly caster, Mel Krieger, led the effort to establish The Casting Board of Governors (BOG) at the Calgary, Alberta conclave in July 1992. Its founding members included American fly casting or fly fishing notables Gary Borger, Leon Chandler, Chico Fernandez, Jim Green, Lefty Kreh, Mel Krieger, Al Kyte, Steve Rajeff, Bruce Richards, Allan Rohrer, Barbara Rohrer, Doug Swisher, Lou Tabory, Dave Whitlock, and Joan Wulff. The first BOG meeting was held at Park High School in Livingston, Montana, during the 1993 conclave.

The program trains and certifies casting instructors in two tiers—Certified Casting Instructor and Master Casting Instructor. Certification requires candidates to pass a written and performance test.

=== Fly Fishing Discovery Center ===
The Federation runs the Fly Fishing Discovery Center, a museum and education center in Livingston, Montana. The museum's Tackle Room chronicles the history of fly fishing with displays of rods, reels, lines, float tubes and art. The Fly Room features thousands of flies tied by masters from around the world. The museum houses the Lewis A. Bell Memorial Fly Fishing Library, a large collection of fly fishing books and journals available for public viewing and research.

The Federation of Flyfishers, the sport's leading national organization has long made the Yellowstone area its center of operations. Its Fly Fishing Discovery Center in Livingston, Montana interprets ecology, angling and conservation and is the Federation's foremost public presence.

— Paul Schullery, Cowboy Trout, 2006

=== Fly Tying Group ===
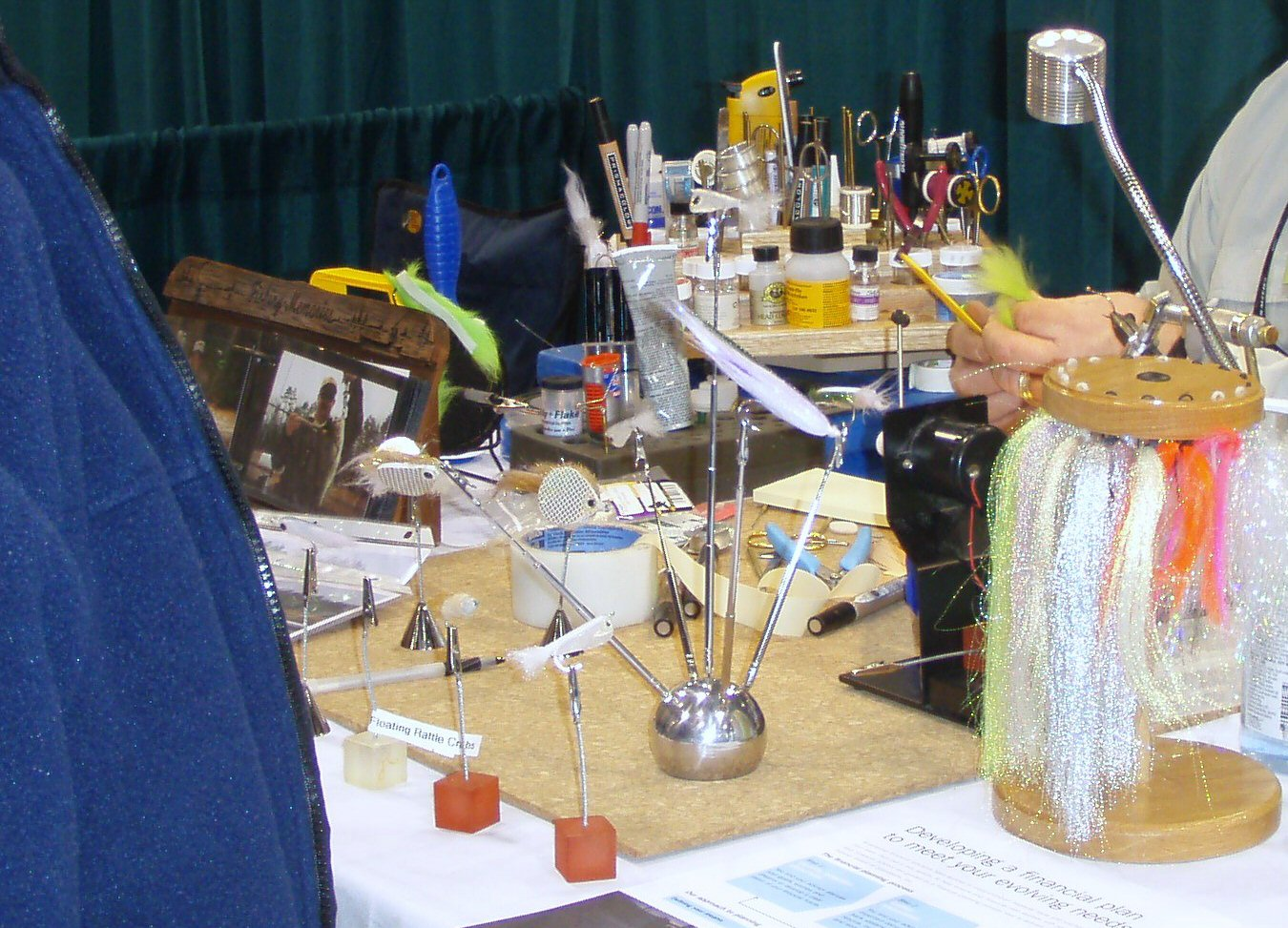
Fly tying demonstration

The Fly Tying Group was established during the 2007 Conclave in Livingston, Montana as a group of fly tiers whose goal is to develop the art of fly tying at the local, regional, council, national, and international levels. The group hosts workshops that teach demonstration fly tying and run fly tying classes at annual conclaves.

=== Guides Association ===
The Guides Association is administered by the Federation as a service to its member guides and to the fly-fishing public. The association aims to connect professional guides with potential clients as well as provide guides some marketing support via the Federation's publications.

=== National Conservation Committee ===
Conservation is one of the founding principles of the Federation of Fly Fishers.

We have been slow to realize the role of political pressures in conservation and are of the opinion now that a united desire for the things that are necessary to perpetuate our sport of fly fishing is the only way to keep from losing many of the things we hold so dear.

— William Nelson, President of the McKenzie Flyfishers Club, 1964

Participating in over 40 years of conservation work, the Federation of Fly Fishers contributes to the protection of fisheries and angling opportunities for the future. The National Conservation Committee is composed of representatives from each Federation of Fly Fishers Council. The Conservation Committee advises and supports conservation efforts with the perspective of each Council.

== Publications ==
- The Fly Fisher
- The Loop
- The Osprey

== Clubs and Councils ==
The organization is composed of 17 regional councils to which belong over 300 fly fishing clubs as well as individual members. The goal is to support fisheries conservation and educational programs for all fish and all waters. Anywhere fly fishers have an interest, the organization plays a role in furthering its goals through its councils, clubs and members.

- Eastern Rocky Mountains
- Eastern Waters
- Florida
- Great Lakes
- Gulf Coast
- Mid Atlantic
- North Eastern
- Northern California
- Ohio
- Oregon
- Southeastern
- Southern
- Southwest
- Texas
- Upper Midwest Council
- Washington State
- Western Rocky Mountain

== Notable Members and Participants ==
- Ted Trueblood
- Ed Zern
- Pete Hidy
- Polly Rosborough
- Dan Bailey
- Bud Lilly
- Arnold Gingrich
- Joan Wulff
- Lee Wulff
- Roderick Haig-Brown
- Tom Brayshaw
- Lefty Kreh
- Enos Bradner
- Nick Lyons
- Paul Schullery
- John Gierach
- Steve Raymond
- Thomas McGuane
- Gary LaFontaine
- George Gran
- Curt Gowdy
- Dave Whitlock
- Gary Borger
- Dave Hughes
- Ernest Schwiebert
- Charles Brooks
- Riley D. Woodford
- Ashley Cooper-Hewitt
- Stanley Walters
- Eric Leiser
- Charles Fox
- Bob Clouser
- Bob Jacklin
- Art Flick
- Mel Krieger
- Mike Swederska
- Tim Rajeff

== See also ==
- American Museum of Fly Fishing
- Trout Unlimited
