= Cortland Line Company =

American fishing-line manufacturer

- Industry: Fishing tackle
- Founded: 1915; 111 years ago
- Founder: Ray F. Smith
- Headquarters: Cortland, New York, United States
- Products: Fishing lines
- Website: www.cortlandline.com

Cortland Line Company is an American manufacturer of fishing lines based in Cortland, New York. Founded in 1915 by Ray F. Smith, the company initially produced silk fly lines and later manufactured nylon and synthetic-coated fly lines. It continues to manufacture fly fishing and braided fishing lines in Cortland.

== History ==
Cortland Line Company was founded in 1915 under the leadership of Ray F. Smith. The company began operating in one of the former Cortland Wagon Company buildings on East Court Street.

By the early 1930s, the company was mass-producing silk fly lines. Silk filaments imported from Japan were twisted into threads at the Cortland mill and then formed into tapered lines using modified braiding machines. Producing a 90-foot double-taper line required 96 thread changes and approximately one eight-hour shift. The braided lines were repeatedly impregnated with oil, dried and finished over a process lasting several days.

The company also produced goods outside the fishing industry. During World War I, it manufactured medical sutures, and during World War II it produced parachute and bomb-fragmentation cords.

== Synthetic fly lines ==
In 1948, Cortland introduced the Cam-O-Flage, a multicolored nylon fly line influenced by the company's wartime work with synthetic materials.

For the 1953 fishing season, the company introduced the Cortland 333 Non-Sinkable Fly Line. The line had a braided nylon core and a nonporous synthetic coating, replacing the oil-impregnated silk construction used in earlier fly lines. A history published by the American Museum of Fly Fishing describes the 333 as the first fly line to use a polyvinyl chloride coating over a tapered braided nylon core.

The company followed with the 444 series of fly lines in 1962.

== Fly line weight standards ==
J. Leon Chandler, who worked for Cortland from 1941 to 1992, said he represented Cortland at a 1959 convention of the American Fishing Tackle Manufacturers Association when its Line Division formed a committee to standardize fly line sizing. The committee developed standards based on the grain weight of the first 30 feet of line, rather than its diameter. The system was intended to provide consistent line classifications across different materials, densities and taper configurations.

== Manufacturing operations ==
As of 2015, the company had consolidated its operations within a 145,000-square-foot production facility on Kellogg Road in Cortland, New York, where it continues to manufacture braided fishing lines and synthetic fly lines.

== See also ==
- Bibliography of fly fishing
- American Museum of Fly Fishing
- Fly Fishers International
