= Ernest Schwiebert =

American architect (1931–2005)

Ernest George Schwiebert (1931–2005) was born in Chicago on June 5, 1931. An architect by profession, Ernest "Ernie" Schwiebert was a renowned angler and angling author. Schwiebert spent his childhood in the Midwest, attended high school at New Trier, north of Chicago, earned his bachelor's degree in architecture from Ohio State University, and earned two doctorates at Princeton in architecture and the history and philosophy of architecture.

== Life story ==
Ernest Schwiebert married Sara Mills in 1957 and had one son (Erik) and two grandchildren (Elisabeth and Turner). Having served in the Air Force, he specialized in planning airports and military bases. Traveling on business, he also visited some of the world's best fishing streams, feeding a passion that had begun during boyhood vacations on the Pere Marquette River in Michigan. In 1977 he left the engineering firm of Tippets, Abbott, McCarthy & Stratton, New York. He made scholarly contributions throughout his life as a writer, architect, and student of the art and science of fly fishing for trout and salmon. He wrote more than 15 books about fly fishing and architecture.

Ernest Schwiebert, also known as Ernie, was a pioneer in the fishery conservation movement and was involved in the founding of Trout Unlimited, Theodore Gordon Flyfishers and the Federation of Fly Fishers. He has served as a Director of both Theodore Gordon Flyfishers and the Atlantic Salmon Federation, and on the scientific advisory boards of TU, FFF and The Nature Conservancy. In recognition of his contributions, a Trout Unlimited Chapter in New Jersey is named for him.

He was best known for his extensive writings about fly-fishing. His books include Matching the Hatch (1955), Nymphs (1973), Salmon of the World (1970), and the two-volume Trout (1978). He wrote numerous magazine articles and short stories which were published in such collections as Remembrances of Rivers Past (1972), Death of a Riverkeeper (1980), and A River for Christmas (1988). An often referenced and quoted writer, Schwiebert has over twelve references in Arnold Gingrich's book The Fishing in Print and fourteen references in Paul Schullery's American Fly Fishing, A History. Gingrich considered Schwiebert's position impregnable as the leading angling author of our time and that he had an impressive ability to absorb entomological detail and convert it into pleasing prose for his readers.

== Awards ==
His numerous awards and honors included the Gold Medal of the American Institute of Architects, The Arnold Gingrich Literary Prize (1978 Federation of Flyfishers), the Aldo Starker Leopold Memorial Award (1994 International Wild Trout Symposium), and life memberships with the Theodore Gordon Flyfishers, Federation of Flyfishers, and The Anglers' Club of New York. He was a member of the Henryville Flyfishers, the Spring Ridge Club, and many other anglers clubs.

== Works ==
Title	Comments
Schwiebert, Ernest G. Jr. (1955). Matching The Hatch-A Practical Guide to Imitation of Insects Found On Eastern and Western Trout Waters. Toronto, Canada: The MacMillan Company.	Matching The Hatch was the first American book to cover fly imitation from a transcontinental perspective and is widely read and reprinted. According to Paul Schullery, Matching The Hatch set the standard for fly entomology and tying studies for the late 20th Century.
Schwiebert, Ernest G. Jr. (1970). Salmon of the World (Limited (750) ed.). New York: Winchester Press. ISBN 0-87691-023-1.	
Schwiebert, Ernest (1972). Remembrances of Rivers Past. New York: The Macmillan Company.	
Schwiebert, Ernest (1973). Nymphs-A Complete Guide to Naturals and Imitations. New York: Winchester Press. ISBN 0-87691-074-6.	
Schwiebert, Ernest (1978). Trout. New York: E. P. Dutton.	
Schwiebert, Ernest G. (1980). Death of a Riverkeeper. New York: E. P. Dutton. ISBN 0-525-08947-0.
Schwiebert, Ernest G. (1983). Trout Strategies. New York: E. P. Dutton. ISBN 0-525-48052-8.	
Schwiebert, Ernest (1988). A River For Christmas and Other Stories. Lexington, Massachusetts: The Stephen Green Press. ISBN 0-8289-0695-5.	
Schwiebert, Ernest (1998). The Henryville Flyfishers-- A Chronicle of American Fly Fishing. Far Hills, NJ: Meadow Run Press. ISBN 1-886967-08-3.	A fascinating account and one of the seminal books on American Fly Fishing clubs.
Schwiebert, Ernest (2007). Nymphs Volume 1: The Mayflies: The Major Species. New York: Lyons Press. ISBN 978-1-59228-499-3.	
Schwiebert, Ernest (2007). Nymphs Volume 2: Caddisflies, Stoneflies, and Other Important Species. New York: Lyons Press. ISBN 978-1-59921-098-8.	
