= Fly casting =

Sport based on fly fishing

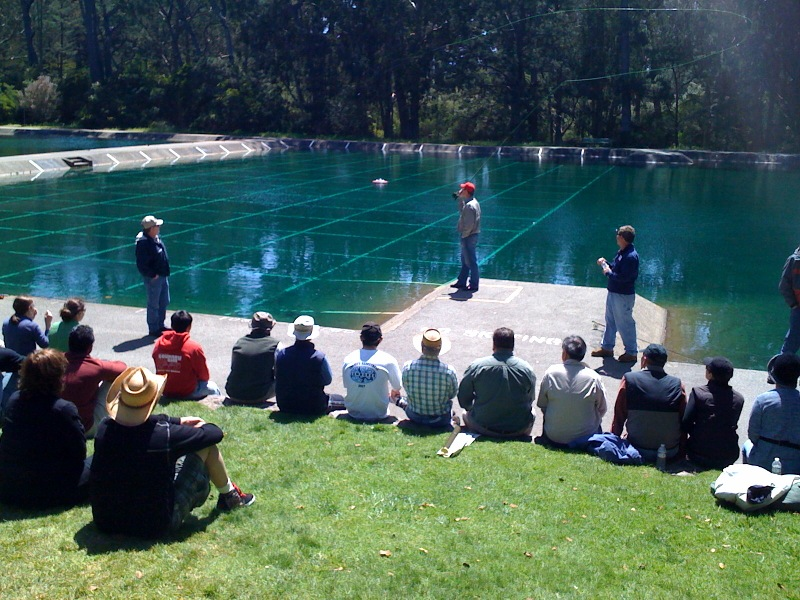
- Casting at Golden Gate Angling & Casting Club, San Francisco, California
- Highest governing body: International Casting Sport Federation
- First contested: England and United States, late 19th century

Characteristics
- Contact: No
- Mixed-sex: No
- Type: Throwing sport

Presence
- Country or region: Worldwide
- Olympic: No
- World Games: 1981, 1985, 1993 – 2005

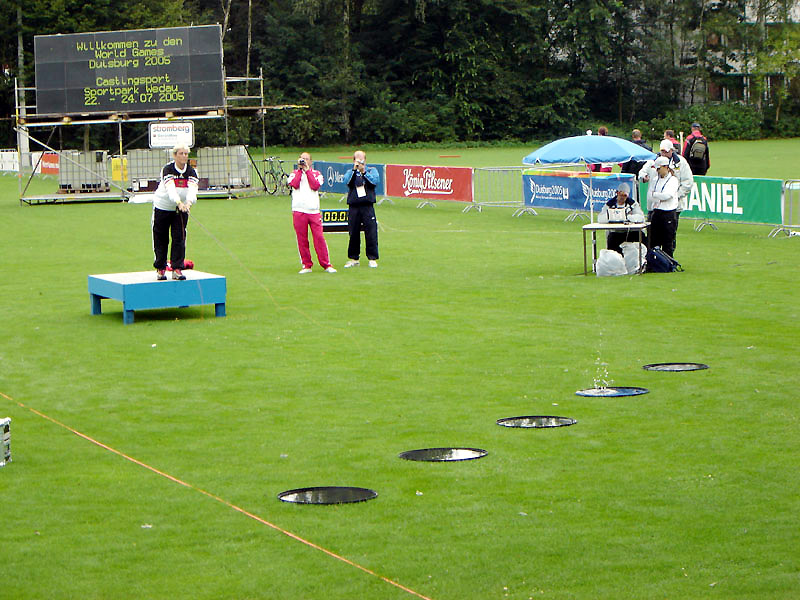
A competitor, Jana Maisel, casts her fly into one of the goal pools at the 2005 World Games in Duisburg.

Fly casting is a competitive variation of fly fishing found in sport fishing and fishing tournaments. This type of sports fishing originated in the 14th century. The modern version of the sport is supervised by the International Casting Sport Federation (ICSF), which was founded in 1955 and as of April 2014 has member associations in 31 countries.

The ICSF sponsors tournaments and recognizes world records for accuracy and distance. This sport uses plastic weights or hookless flies, and can be held on water or on athletic fields. There are competitive divisions for almost all types of fly, fixed spool, and revolving spool tackle, and for various classes of competitors. It was included in the World Games (see photo) until 2005, and has been considered for the Olympics.

== Fly Casting Championships ==
The American Casting Association held its 100th Annual Casting Championships in 2008 at the Golden Gate Angling & Casting Club. There are several disciplines in fly casting such as trout accuracy, trout distance, sea trout distance, salmon distance, spey distance etc. A research tool called Fly Casting Analyzer may be used in fly casting.

== Bibliography ==
- Robinson, Gilmer G. (1942). Fly Casting. New York: A. S. Barnes & Co.
- Smedley, Harold H. "Dike" (1949). Accuracy Fly Casting. Chicago-New York: Ziff-Davis Publishing., illustrated fly casting guide by Winner of National, Great Lakes, Midwest, Michigan, and New York Fly Casting Championships.
- Wulff, Joan (1987). Joan Wulff's Fly-Casting Techniques. New York: Nick Lyons Books. ISBN 0-941130-38-X.
- Krieger, Mel; Nelson Ishiyama; Albert Jules McClane; Ben Blackwell (1988). The Essence of Fly Casting. Club Pacific. ISBN 978-0-944169-02-5.
- Jaworowski, Ed (1999). Troubleshooting the Cast. Mechanicsburg, PA: Stackpole Books. ISBN 978-0-8117-2942-0.
- Jaworowski, Ed (2006). The Cast: Theories and Applications for More Effective Techniques. Mechanicsburg, PA: Stackpole Books. ISBN 978-0-8117-3257-4.
- Kreh, Lefty (2007). Lefty Kreh's Longer Fly Casting, New and Revised: The Compact, Practical Handbook That Will Add Ten Feet--Or More--To Your Cast. New York: Lyons Press. ISBN 978-1-59921-087-2.
- Kreh, Lefty (2008). Casting With Lefty Kreh. Mechanicsburg, PA: Stackpole Books. ISBN 978-0-8117-0369-7.
- Kyte, Al (2008). The Orvis Guide to Better Fly Casting: A Problem-Solving Approach. New York: Lyons Press. ISBN 978-1-59228-870-0.

== See also ==
- Casting (fishing)
- Fishing tournament
- Fly Casting Analyzer
- Joan Wulff
