= Royal Wulff =

Artificial fly fishing lure

- Artificial fly
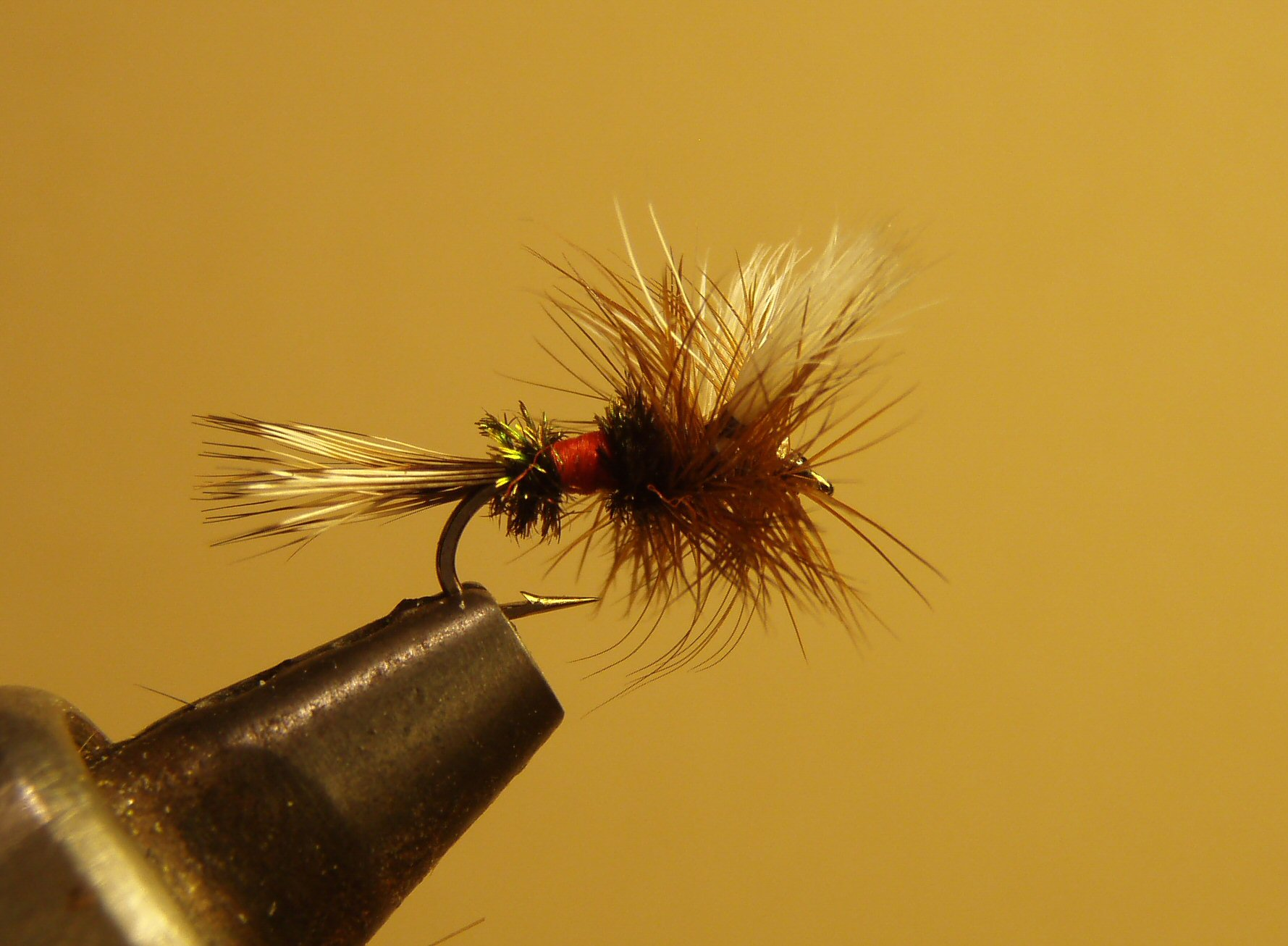
- Royal Wulff
- Type: Dry Fly
- Imitates: Attractor

History
- Creator: L.Q. Quackenbush, Lee Wulff
- Created: 1929–30

Materials
- Typical sizes: 8–16
- Typical hooks: Dry fly hook
- Thread: Black
- Tail: Brown or white bucktail
- Body: Peacock herl separated with red floss
- Wing: White calf hair or bucktail
- Hackle: Brown

Reference(s)
- Pattern references: David Klausmeyer (2013), 101 Favorite Dry Flies: History, Tying Tips, and Fishing Strategies

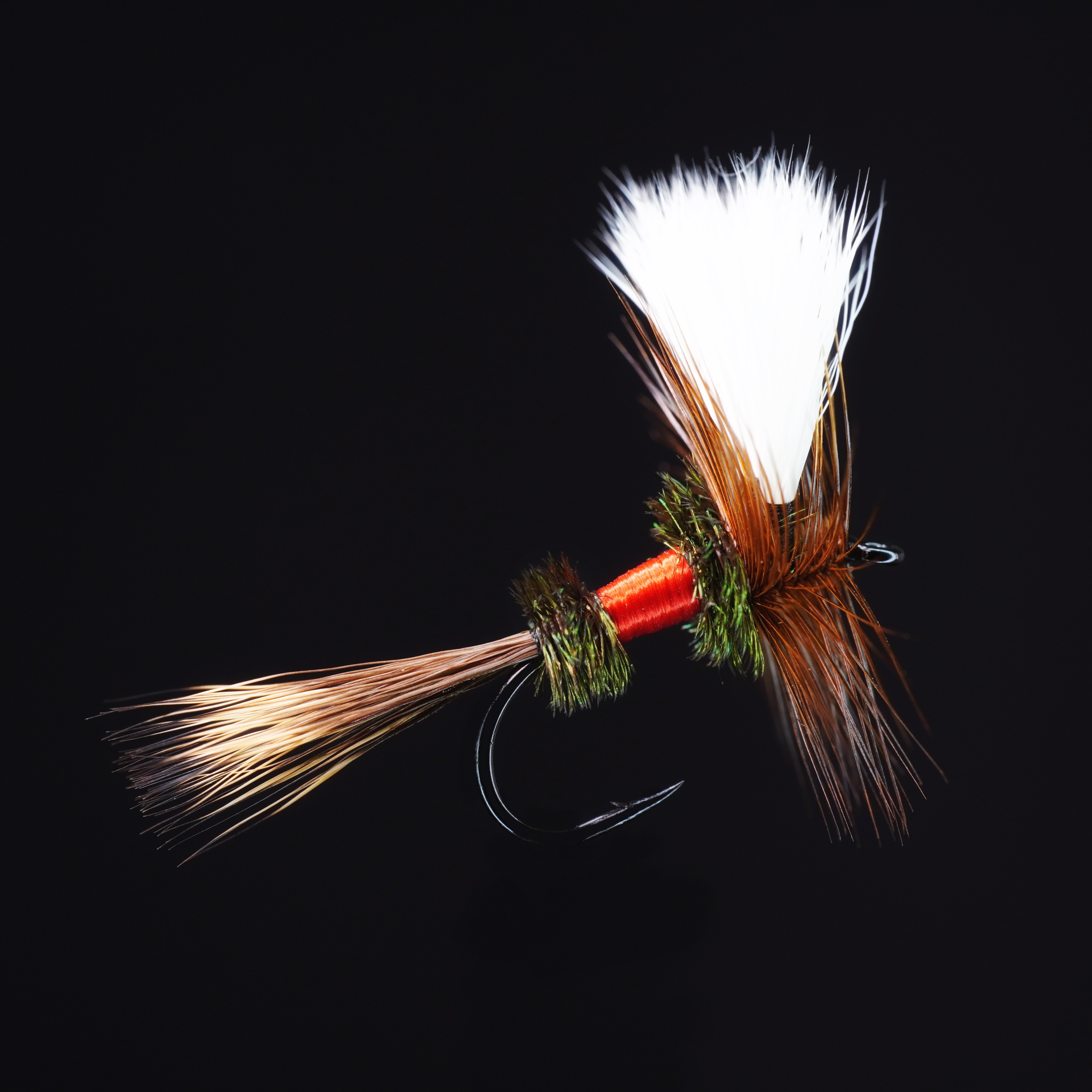
Royal Wulff

The Royal Wulff is a popular artificial fly used for dry fly fishing. It is an attractor pattern and a descendant of both the Royal Coachman fly and the Wulff style of hair wing flies named for Lee Wulff.

== Origin ==
The adoption of the hairwing patterns that eventually became the Wulff dry fly style began in the late 1920 in several locations. Although many angling writers credit Lee Wulff with the Royal Wulff, Q. L. Quackenbush, an early member of the Beaverkill Trout Club above Lew Beach in New York is often cited as the creator. In 1929–30 both Quackenbush and Wulff had independently modified the Royal Coachman pattern, particularly the Fanwing Royal Coachman with hair wings and tails. Both Wulff and Quackenbush made the modifications because the Fanwing Royal Coachman proved too flimsy and fragile on rough water. The first Quackenbush versions were tied commercially by Rube Cross and were named Quack Coachman, Hair-winged Royal Coachman and Quack Special.

In the 1930s Lee Wulff collaborated with Dan Bailey during the development of his hairwing patterns and Bailey encouraged him to rename the flies. The original Ausable Gray, Coffin May and Bucktail Coachman became the Grey Wulff, White Wulff and Royal Wulff. Three additional patterns were created by the end of 1930, the Blonde Wulff, Brown Wulff and Black Wulff. The series would gain prominence after Wulff introduced them to Ray Bergman, another fly angler and outdoor writer who became the Fishing editor for Outdoor Life magazine. Bergman embraced the flies and included them his two editions of Trout (1938, 1952).

The Wulff flies were designed by Lee Wulff and fill a decided need in large sizes. I consider them necessary to the well-balanced fly box. New Wulff patterns, Black Wulff and Grizzly Wulff [designed by Dan Bailey] have been added to my color plates because they are considered very important by fishermen in the Rockies as well as other sections.

— Ray Bergman, Trout (1952)

Wulff considered the pattern somewhat generic and encouraged variation and evolution of the pattern instead of rigid adherence to a precise recipe. Dan Bailey, who fished regularly in Montana and eventually established a fly shop and mail order business in Livingston, Montana, in 1938 promoted the series extensively to western fly anglers.

The Wulff flies, especially the Royal Wulff, are still a staple in angler's fly boxes around the world. Angler and writer John Gierach believes the Royal Wulff is one of the most popular dry patterns over the last half century.

== Imitates ==
The Royal Wulff as a derivative of the Royal Coachman is considered an attractor pattern, or as Dave Hughes in Trout Flies-The Tier's Reference (1999) calls them—searching patterns—as they do not resemble any specific insect or baitfish. Early in the 20th century, Theodore Gordon once was of the opinion that the Royal Coachman resembled some form of flying ant, while in the 1950s, Preston Jennings, a noted fly tier and angler thought the Royal Coachman resembled Isonychia mayflies.

== Materials ==
The distinguishing features of Royal Coachman derivatives like the Royal Wulff are the peacock herl body partitioned with red silk or floss, a white wing and brown or red-brown hackle. The Royal Wulff is a dry fly and the wing is typical tied with white bucktail or calf tail. Tailing on the Royal Wulff is typically white or brown bucktail. They are typically tied on size 8–16 dry fly hooks.

== See also ==
- Wulff series of dry flies
