= Joan Wulff =

American fly fisher (born 1926)

Joan Salvato Wulff (born 1926) is a fly fisher. In 1951, she won the national fly-casting distance title, an all-male competition, and was a National Casting Champion from 1943-1960. She started the Wulff School of Fly Fishing along with her husband, Lee Wulff, in 1978, along the Beaverkill River in New York. The author of numerous books, Wulff was inducted into the International Game Fish Association Hall of Fame (2007) and American Casting Association Hall of Fame and is widely regarded as the architect of modern-day fly-casting mechanics.

== Early life and angling career ==
Joan Wulff was born in Paterson, New Jersey. Joan's father, Jimmy Salvato owned the Paterson Rod and Gun Store and was an avid angler and outdoorsman. He was the first to introduce Joan to fly-fishing when she was ten years old. She joined the local casting club and very quickly began winning club and regional casting competitions in 1939,1939, and 1940. At age 16 Joan graduated from high school and won her first national casting competition in Chicago at the National Association of Angling and Casting Club competition. The now inoperative magazine, American Magazine, published an article named "No Flies on Joanie" in 1945, bringing Wulff national recognition. That same year Pennsylvania Angler featured her on the cover of their magazine. In 1959 Wulff was hired by the Garcia Corporation, which was the largest tackle company in the country at the time. She became the first woman to be a paid spokesperson for an angling company. Joan first interacted with Lee Wulff, a famous angler and cinematographer, filming together. Later, the two were married in 1967, traveling and fishing across the world together. This period of time included both Joan's introduction to salmon fishing, but also her extensive promotion of women's fishing clothing and equipment. Joan has been interviewed by James Thull, the Montana State University Trout and Salmonoid librarian, and is now a part of his Angling and Oral History Project.

== Wulff School of Fly Fishing ==
In 1978, Joan and her husband Lee Wulff, moved to Lew Beach, New York, and the upper Beaverkill River, where Joan carried out her plan of opening a fly-fishing school.
