= Fly line =

Type of fishing line

Fly line is a fishing line used by fly anglers to cast artificial flies using a fly rod. Fly lines evolved from horsehair lines described by Izaak Walton in The Compleat Angler (1653) through the use of silk, braided synthetics to the modern-day plastic-coated lines.

== Fly line materials ==
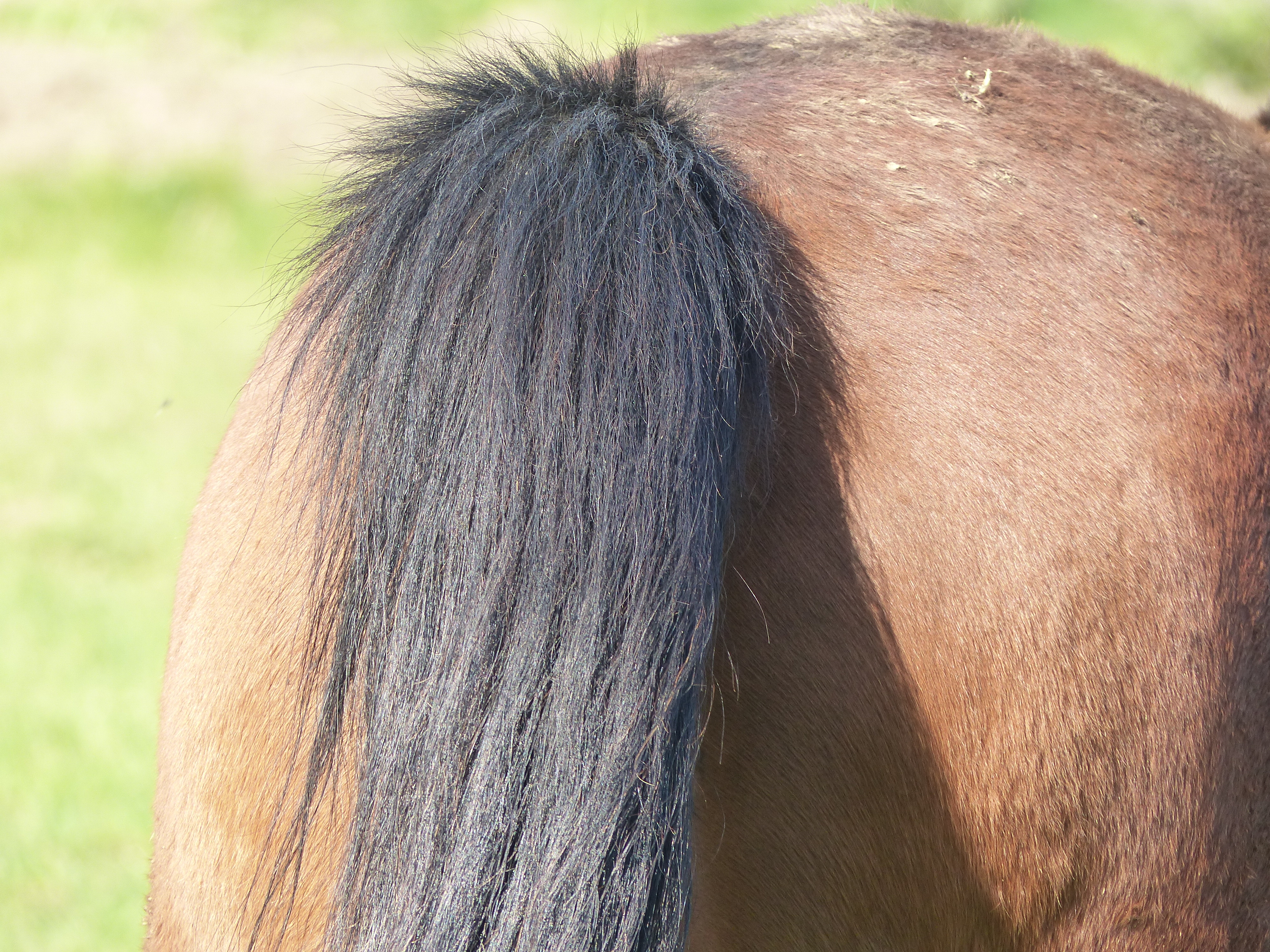
Horse Tail

The earliest fly lines were typically of a fixed length of eight to ten feet and constructed of horsehair. Long strands of horsehair from horse tails were woven to construct a tapered line of typically two strands at the tip and some 40 strands at the butt. Fixed length horsehair lines were the norm well into the 17th century and the hair from a stallion was the preferred material. Until the 19th century, fly lines were being made with woven silk which replaced horsehair as the material of choice. By the 19th century, fly lines were longer and called running lines that were stored on a fly reel and cast through guides on a fly rod.

By the late 19th century, fly lines were still being constructed with silk but were braided instead of woven. Braiding created a hollow core which improved flotation. Nylon, invented by Dupont and in the 1930s found it way into fly line manufacturing in the late 1940s. Braided Nylon fly lines were cheaper than silk but suffered from their tendency to stretch when wet. In the post-WWII era, Dacron also known as polyester, became the material of choice for braided fly lines. Braided Dacron fly lines floated well and were lighter, more durable and cheaper to manufacture than silk lines.

In 1952, the Cortland Line Company pioneered the use of vinyl to coat braided cores creating the first plastic coated fly lines that are the mainstream today. Throughout the last half of the 20th century, plastic fly line technology facilitated all manner of fly line innovation to address fly fishing for cold-water, warm-water and saltwater species globally. The most recent innovation in fly line materials came in 2007 when Scientific Anglers introduced textured fly lines. Texturing the surface of the plastic coated fly lines reduced friction improving casting distance and line pickup.

=== Fly line buoyancy ===
Fly lines are designed to float (F) or sink (S). Floating lines generally designed with positive buoyancy for their entire length. Some fly lines have both a sinking section at the tip and a floating running line (F/S). Sinking lines can be fast sinking or slow sinking generally have a specified sink rate in inches per second. Floating fly lines are created by embedding minute air bubbles in the plastic coating around the core. Sinking fly lines or sinking sections of fly lines created by embedding minute particles of tungsten or other heavy metal in the plastic coating.

== Fly line sizes and weights ==
In the 1930s, the National Association of Accuracy Casting Competition (NAACC) established size standards for fly lines based on the diameter of the woven silk lines. The standard was alphabetical with A being the largest and I being the smallest. Tapered fly lines were designated with multiple letters, i.e. HDH which indicated it was a double tapered (DT) line.

NAACC Official Standard Table of Fly Line Calibrations with Letter Designations, Maximum Permissible Tolerances, and Maximum Permissible Average Deviations
Letter Size	Nominal Diameters in 1000th of an Inch
I	.022
H	.025
G	.030
F	.035
E	.040
D	.045
C	.050
B	.055
A	.060
AA	.065
AAA	.070
AAAA	.075
AAAAA	.080
Notes
1. Sizes larger than 5A shall be specified only by diameter in thousandths of an inch.
2. The maximum permissible tolerance, plus or minus, shall be one-half of the difference the nominal diameter and nominal diameters of adjacent sizes or 2 1/2 one thousandths on all letter sizes except I and I to H 1 1/2 one thousandths.
3. The maximum permissible deviation throughout the length of the line shall not exceed one thousandth of one inch, plus and/or minus.

The advent of lighter Dacron and vinyl coated fly lines rendered the NAACC alphabetic size standard problematic. It was conceived when most all fly lines were braided silk and one manufacturer's HDH line was similar in performance to another's. Fly rod manufacturers had confidence in recommending a specific size fly line for their rods and that any silk line with that designation would perform well regardless of brand. However, it was the weight of the fly line that really mattered, not the size and the lighter synthetic lines performed differently than silk lines of the same size. This caused confusion for consumers and fly rod manufacturers. In 1960, after several years of collaboration between casting experts, rod and line manufacturers and industry media, the American Fly Fishing Tackle Association approved a weight standard for fly lines that persists today. The standard establishes a numbering system of fly lines from 1 to 15, with 1 being the lightest. The standard establishes the desired weight in grains or grams for the first thirty feet of fly line minus any level tip.

AFFTA Approved Fly Line Weight Specification
Line Weight	Low	Tapers Target Weight in Grains	High	Line Weight	Low	Tapers Target Weight in Grams	High
1	54	60	66	1	3.50	3.90	4.30
2	74	80	86	2	4.80	5.20	5.60
3	94	100	106	3	6.10	6.50	6.90
4	114	120	126	4	7.40	7.80	8.20
5	134	140	146	5	8.70	9.10	9.50
6	152	160	168	6	9.90	10.40	10.90
7	177	185	193	7	11.50	12.00	12.50
8	202	210	218	8	13.10	13.60	14.10
9	230	240	250	9	14.90	15.55	16.20
10	270	280	290	10	17.50	18.15	18.80
11	318	330	342	11	20.60	21.40	22.20
12	368	380	392	12	23.80	24.60	25.40
13	435	450	465	13	28.20	29.20	30.30
14	485	500	515	14	31.10	32.40	33.70
15	535	550	565	15	34.30	35.60	36.90
Weight is for the First 30 feet of Line minus Level Tip

== Fly line shapes and nomenclature ==
=== Traditional fly line tapers ===
- Level fly line (L)
- Double Taper fly line (DT)
- Weight Forward Taper fly line (WF)
Traditional Fly Line Tapers
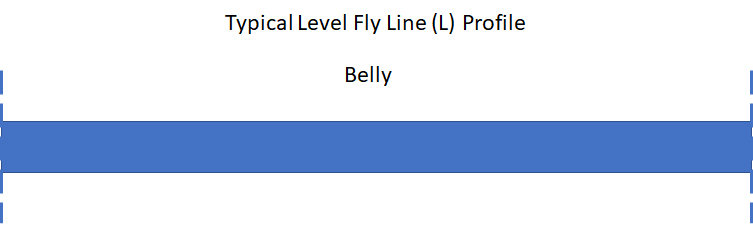
Typical Level (L) Fly Line Profile

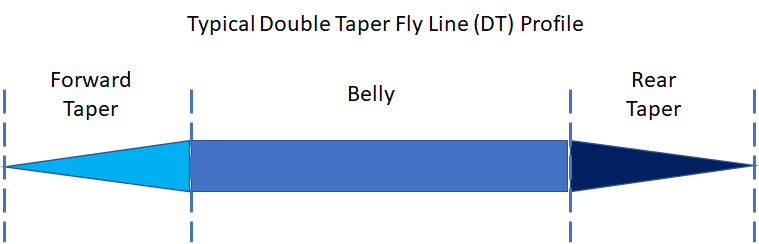
Typical Double Taper (DT) Fly Line Profile

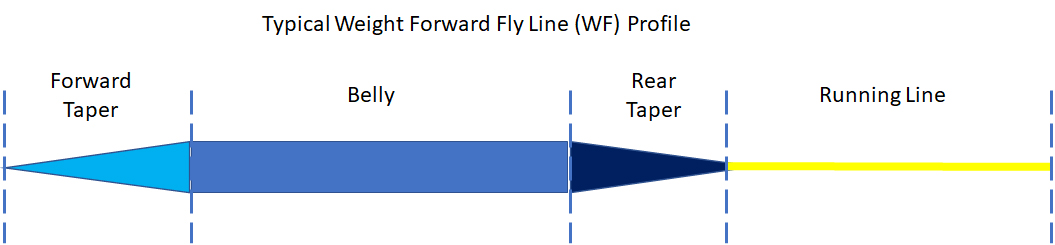
Typical Weight Forward (WF) Fly Line Profile

=== Specialized fly line tapers ===
- Shooting Heads/Shooting Taper (SH/ST)
- Triangle Tapered fly line
- Tenkara
Specialized Fly Line Tapers
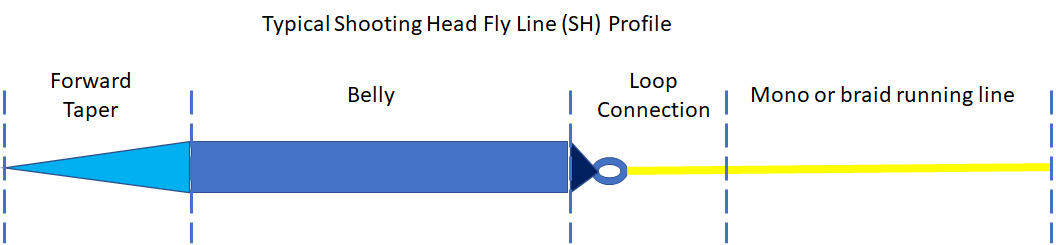
Typical Shooting Head (SH) Fly Line Profile

=== Fly line nomenclature ===
Fly lines are designed for compatibility with fly rods of specific actions and recommended line weights. Dimensions of fly line tapers vary widely to meet the needs of different casting situations, rod types, fly selection and target species. Although there is no industry standard naming convention, most fly line manufacturers use: Taper-weight-buoyancy to identify any given line. Example: WF-5-F would indicate a weight forward taper, a line recommended for a 5 weight rod and a floating line. Some fly lines, especially heavier sinking fly lines and sink-tip line are merely identified by their grain weight, i.e. WF- 150 gr. (grain) - S. . Common fly line terms include:

- Tip - the section of fly line (if any) just in front of the front taper.
- Front taper - the section of fly that tapers from the tip to the beginning of the belly
- Belly — the level section between the front taper and the rear taper
- Running line - the level section of line from the rear taper to the end or butt of the fly line
- Loop - Some modern fly lines have loops built-in to the tip and/or butt to facilitation the connection of leaders and backing
- Sink-tip - A fly line where only the tapered portion of the fly line is designed to sink
- Sink-rate - The nominal rate at which the line will sink in inches per second.
  - Sink-rates are usually expressed as Types 1–6 in either numerals or Roman numerals with the lowest number being the slowest sink-rates. However, there is no industry standard for fly line sink-rates and one manufacturer's sink-rates may be different than another's for the same type rating.

== Fly line manufacturers and brands ==
(Year founded)

=== Historic (now defunct or no longer producing/selling fly lines) ===
- Ashaway (1824)
- Gudebrod, Inc (1870)
- U.S. Line Company (mid-1800s)
- Western Fishing Line Company (c. 1930)
- Sunset (1932)
- Hall Line Corporation (1821)
- Rain-Beau (1821)
- Weber (1868)
- Bevin Wilcox (1919)
- Norwich Line Company (S.A. Jones Line Company (1930)
- B.F. Gladding and Company (1816)
- Horrocks Ibbotson (1909)
- South Bend (1905)
- Shakespeare (1905)
- Pflueger (1913)
- Newton Line Company (1909)
- Masterline U.K. (early 1970s)
- Berkley (1937)
- Marathon (1937)
- Fenwick (1954)
- ABU (1921)
- Garcia (1920s)
- Horton Manufacturing Company (1836)
- Montgomery Ward (1872)
- Sears (1893)
- Western Auto (1909)
- Abercrombie & Fitch (1892)
- Herter’s (1893)

=== Current brands ===
- Scientific Anglers (1945)
- Cortland (1915)
- Airflo UK and US (1980s)
- RIO Products (1990s)
- Orvis (1856)
- Royalwulff Products (1982)
- Monic (1990)
- Teeny (1971)
- TenkaraUSA (2009)
- Maxxon Outfitters (2015)
