= Royal Coachman =

Artificial fly fishing lure

- Artificial fly
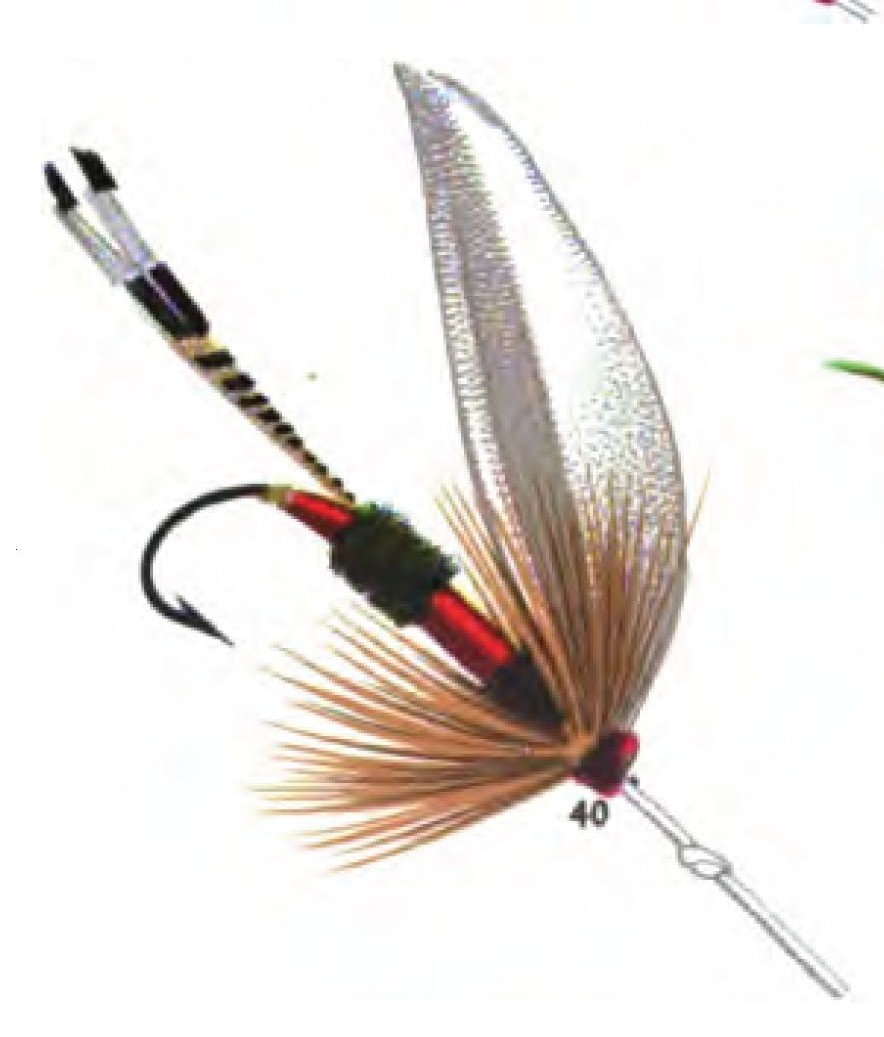
- Drawing of Royal Coachman, 1892
- Type: Dry fly, Wet fly, Streamer
- Imitates: Attractor

History
- Creator: John Haily
- Created: 1878

Materials
- Typical sizes: DF13 Royal Coachman 10–20 (Dry), 8–14 (Wet), 1–8 (Streamer)
- Typical hooks: TMC 100 (Dry), Nymph hook 2X long (Wet), Straight eye streamer hook, TMC 9394 3x heavy 4xl
- Thread: Black 6/0
- Tail: golden pheasant tippet
- Body: peacock herl partitioned with red silk or floss
- Wing: white wing
- Hackle: brown or red-brown

Uses
- Primary use: Trout, grayling
- Other uses: Steelhead, Atlantic salmon

Reference(s)
- Pattern references: Favorite Flies and their Histories, 1892, Marbury

The Royal Coachman is an artificial fly that has been tied as a wet fly, dry fly and streamer pattern. Today, the Royal Coachman and its variations are tied mostly as dry flies and fished floating on the water surface. It is a popular and widely used pattern for freshwater game fish, particularly trout and grayling. Large streamer versions are also used for winter steelhead and Atlantic salmon.

In Royal Coachman – The Lore and Legends of Fly-Fishing (1999) Paul Schullery describes the Royal Coachman:

No fly better represents this freewheeling era [late 19th century] in fly tying than the Royal Coachman, which among the general public may be the world's best-known fly. Its name has the right combination of romance and class to appeal even to people who don't fish, and the fly has such a commanding appearance that few fly fisherman can resist having some permutation of the pattern in their fly boxes, even if they never use it. Most of them don't know it, but the Royal Coachman is the first great American fly pattern...

— Paul Schullery,

== Origin ==
The Royal Coachman was first tied as a traditional winged wet fly and is a derivative of the Coachman wet fly. Mary Orvis Marbury in her Favorite Flies and Their Histories (1892) tells the story of its creation as follows:

The Royal Coachman was first made in 1878 by John Haily, a professional fly-dresser living in New York City. In writing of other matters, he inclosed [sic] a sample of this fly for us to see, saying: "A gentleman wanted me to tie some Coachmen for him to take up into the north woods, and to make them extra strong, so I have tied them with a little band of silk in the middle, to prevent the peacock bodies from fraying out. I have also added a tail of the barred feathers of the wood-duck, and I think it makes a very handsome fly." A few evenings later, a circle of us were together "disputing the fly question," one of the party claiming that numbers were "quite as suitable to designate the flies as so many nonsensical names." The others did not agree with him, but he said: "What can you do? Here is a fly intended to be a Coachman, yet it is not the true Coachman; it is quite unlike it, and what can you call it?" Mr. L. C. Orvis, brother of Mr. Charles Orvis, who was present, said: "Oh, that is easy enough; call it the Royal Coachman, it is so finely dressed!" And this name in time came to be known and used by all who are familiar with the fly.

The Royal Coachman pattern is one of the very few patterns that appeared in Marbury's work that is still being tied and fished today in some form or another.

== Imitates ==
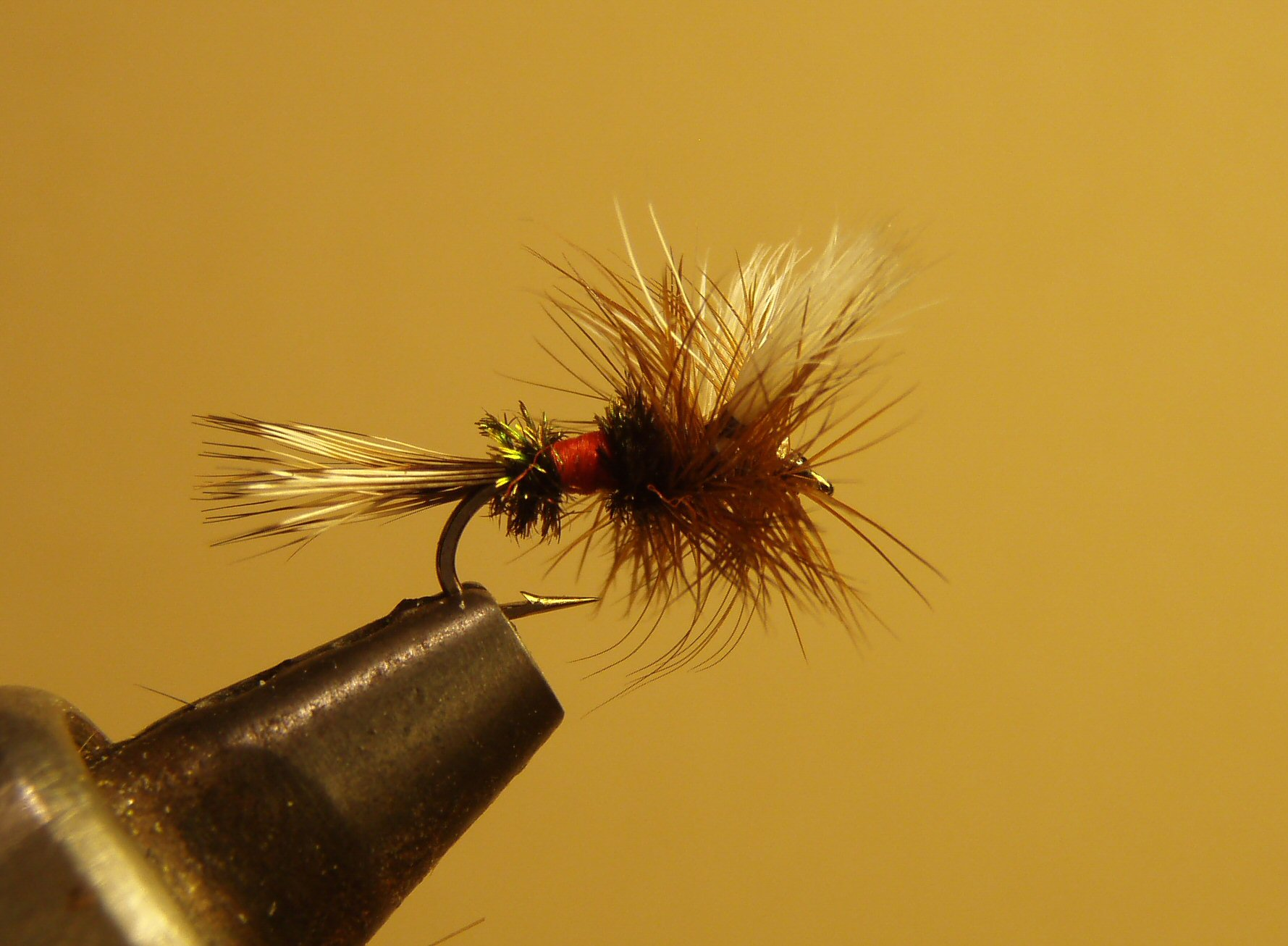
A #12 Royal Wulff dry fly, a Royal Coachman derivative

The Royal Coachman and its derivatives are considered attractor patterns, or as Dave Hughes in Trout Flies – The Tier's Reference (1999) calls them – searching patterns – as they do not resemble any specific insect or baitfish. Early in the 20th century, Theodore Gordon once was of the opinion that the Royal Coachman resembled some form of flying ant, while in the 1950s, Preston Jennings, a noted fly tier and angler thought the Royal Coachman resembled Isonychia mayflies.

== Materials ==
The distinguishing features of any Royal Coachman or its derivatives are the peacock herl body partitioned with red silk or floss, a white wing and brown or red-brown hackle. Depending on whether the fly is tied as a dry fly, wet fly or streamer the white wing can be made with white duck quill, bucktail, calf tail, hen neck, hackle points or other white material. Tailing has varied over the years from the original wood duck flank to include golden pheasant tippet, brown or red hackle, moose, elk and deer hair.

== Variations and sizes ==
There are many variations on the original Royal Coachman. Typically dry fly variations are tied on hook sizes 10–16, wet fly versions on hook sizes 8–14 and streamer versions on hook sizes 1 to 8. Commonly named variations include:

- Royal Trude – a down hair wing dry fly
- Royal Coachman Bucktail – a hair wing streamer pattern
- Royal Coachman Streamer – a feather wing streamer pattern
- Fanwing Royal Coachman – a dry fly
- Royal Wulff – a hair wing dry fly
- Royal Humpy – a hair bodied dry fly
- Royal Sakasa Kebari – a reverse tied soft hackled tenkara wet fly
Royal Coachman Gallery
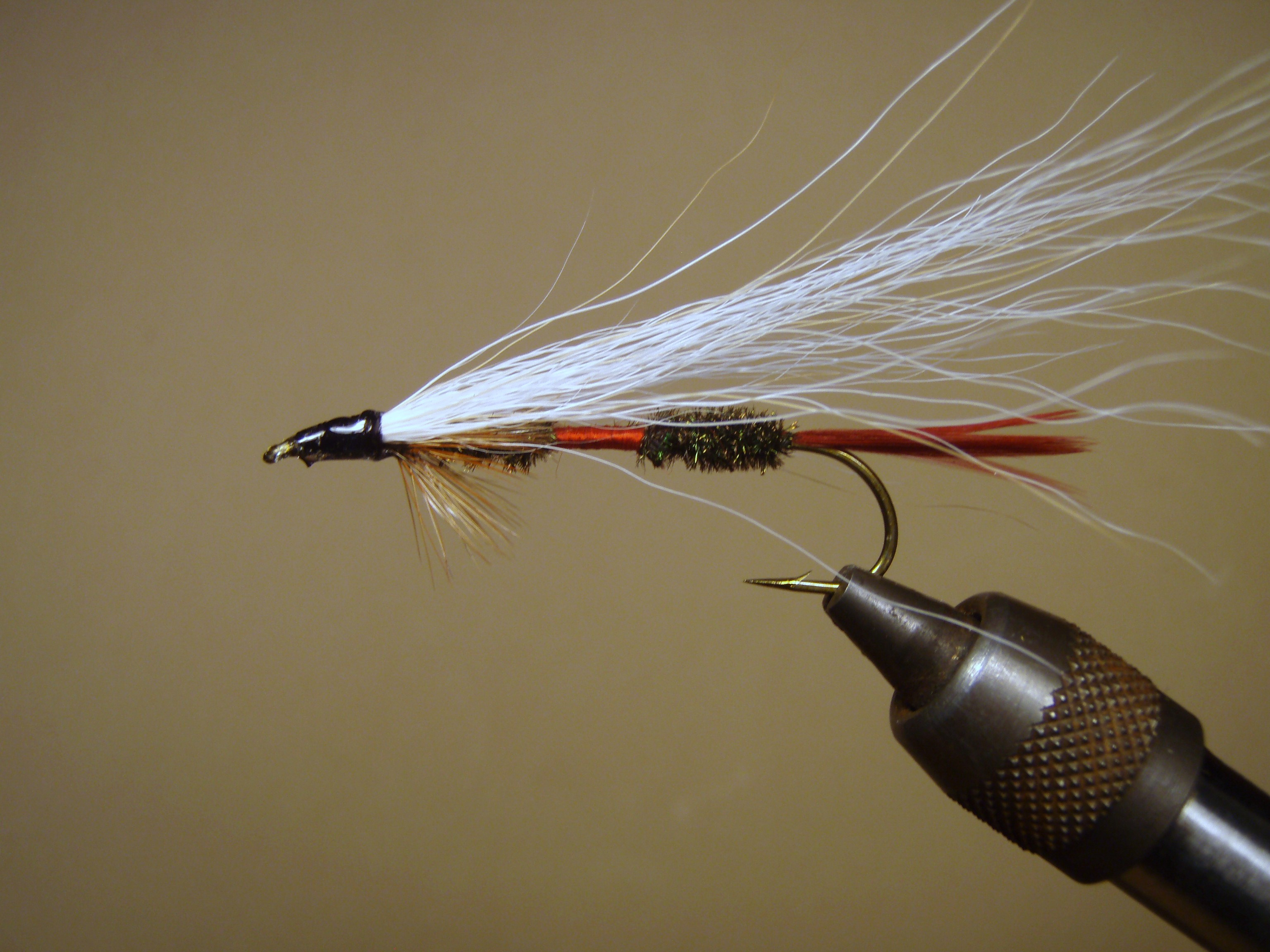
Royal Coachman Bucktail

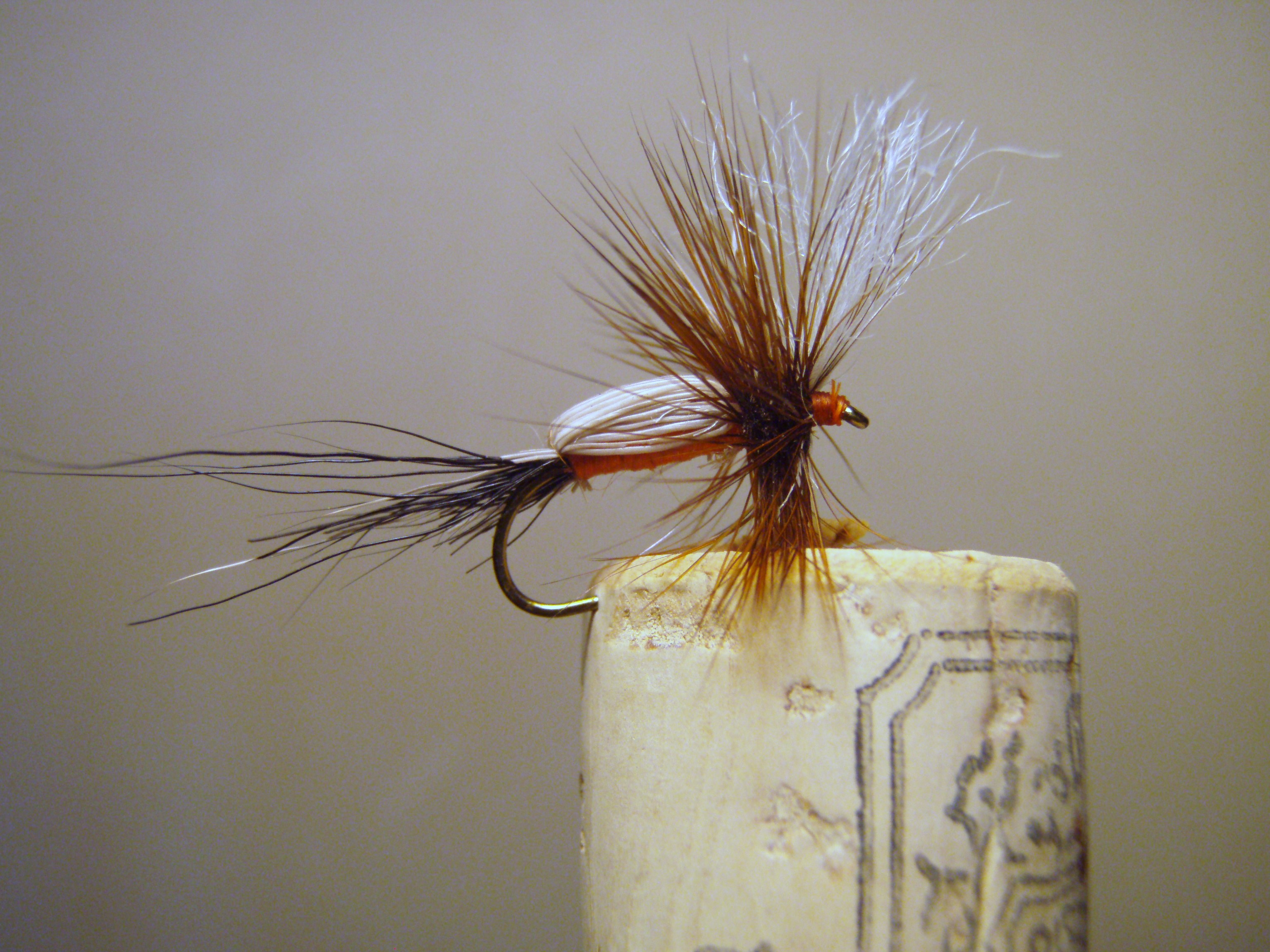
Royal Humpy dry fly
