= Lee Wulff =

American fisherman (1905–1991)

- Born: Henry Leon Wulff; February 10, 1905; Valdez, Alaska
- Died: April 28, 1991 (aged 86); Hancock, New York
- Cause of death: Plane crash
- Occupations: Artist, angler, writer, filmmaker
- Known for: Atlantic salmon conservation, promoting catch and release ethics
- Spouse(s): Helen Riha (1929–1945 (divorce)), Ella Manuel (1947–1949 (divorce)), Kay Gillette (1955–1962 (divorce)), Joan Wulff (1967–)
- Children: Allan and Barry Wulff (Helen Riha)
- Parent(s): Charles and Lilly Wulff

Lee Wulff (February 10, 1905 – April 28, 1991), born Henry Leon Wulff, was an artist, pilot, fly fisherman, author, filmmaker, outfitter and conservationist who made significant contributions to recreational fishing, especially fly fishing and the conservation of Atlantic salmon.

== Early life ==
Lee Wulff was born on February 10, 1905, in Valdez, District of Alaska, to parents Charles and Lilly Wulff of Brooklyn and Staten Island, New York, respectively. Charles Wulff had left Brooklyn around 1900 to seek gold in Alaska but soon became dependent on other work and settled in Valdez, a small frontier town, where he was a deputy sheriff and newspaper publisher. Lee's mother was a Norwegian immigrant from Staten Island who eventually traveled to Valdez to marry Charles. They had three children: Henry (Lee), Audrey and Lillian. Lee learned to fish at an early age in the rivers and saltwater surrounding Valdez. By age 10 he was learning how to fly fish with lancewood/greenheart rods and silk fly lines and leaders. During the winter of 1915–16, Charles Wulff moved the family back to Brooklyn to assume management of his deceased grandfather's coal business. Lee disliked the big city of Brooklyn and longed for the outdoors of Valdez. However, he did well in Brooklyn public schools, achieving honor student status.

In 1920, Charles Wulff sold his interest in the Brooklyn coal company and moved the family to San Diego, California. Lee quickly adapted to the region's local saltwater fishing and routinely fished for sea bass, corvina and yellowtail in the kelp beds along the Pacific Ocean beaches with his high school friends. He graduated from San Diego High School on January 27, 1922, aged 18. He attended the San Diego State College for two years before transferring to Stanford University to study engineering. At San Diego State he played varsity and lettered in football, basketball and track. He graduated from Stanford on June 21, 1926, with a degree in engineering. Despite his degree, Wulff did not want to be an engineer, and, with the reluctant support of his father, he decided to pursue a career as an artist.

=== Paris ===
In the summer of 1926, at age 21, Wulff traveled to Paris, France, to study art, and he eventually enrolled in the Académie Delecluse in Montparnasse. He enjoyed art school and received promising reviews on his work from two exhibitions in July and September 1927. While in Paris, he met another American art student, Helen Riha, who was a graduate of the New York School of Fine and Applied Arts and from Schenectady, New York. Helen would become Lee's first wife. Despite pressure from his father to pursue engineering work, on September 13, 1927, Wulff left Paris to return to New York and start a career as an artist.

== New York ==
Arriving in New York on September 25, 1927, Wulff found lodgings in Greenwich Village where most young artists lived at the time. With only $100 in his pocket, he began seeking employment as an artist. Sustained with a few part-time jobs through the winter of 1927, he finally obtained regular employment with an advertising agency in January 1928 at a salary of $50 per week. He found time from his work to fish the Esopus and Beaverkill rivers in the Catskills. He began tying flies, and he met and discussed fly fishing with other New York anglers, one of whom was Dan Bailey who later became a celebrated fly angler in Montana. In the spring of 1928, Wulff was reunited with Helen Riha who had been working in New York for over a year. They both liked fly fishing and spent a lot of time together in the Catskills. They became engaged in the fall of 1928 and were married in Greenwich, Connecticut, on June 1, 1929.

The Wulffs quit their New York jobs to embark on a three-month honeymoon by car through the Southwest to San Diego to see Lee's parents, returning to New York via the northern Rockies and Midwest. They arrived in New York in late September 1929, both unemployed. Although they both found jobs, the stock market crash on October 29, 1929, led to cuts in pay. Early in 1930, the couple moved to Louisville, Kentucky to work for a local advertising agency. By August 1930 they had returned to New York, Lee being very disappointed with both the job and the fishing in Kentucky.

In the early 1930s, Lee and Helen were fishing more and working less but sustaining themselves with freelance work. Lee was making acquaintances with future notables in the fly angling and outdoor business world—John McDonald, Fortune Magazine writer and author of Quill Gordon, illustrators Mead Schaeffer and John Atherton, and artist Norman Rockwell. He was writing a few articles, teaching fly tying and giving talks on fly fishing to various clubs, gradually becoming respected as an authority on the subject.

== Learning about salmon ==
In 1933, the Wulffs made a trip to the Margaree River in Nova Scotia where Lee landed his first fly-caught Atlantic salmon on a bi-visible dry fly.

Taking fly fishing to the general public, he created a sustainable business. Two key ideas helped him make fly fishing into a profitable business. In 1939, he released the book Handbook of Freshwater Fishing, where he maps out the principles of catch and release fishing. The way he puts catch and release is that there will be more fish in the rivers, so you can come back again and again and catch fish; he says also that the fish get smarter making them harder to catch and making the fisherman have to be more accurate with his casts. Wulff is considered the premier proponent of catch and release fishing. The second part of the business model was to set up organizations such as Trout Unlimited, and others like it, to protect the habitats that the trout live in and making the beautiful places where fishermen fish stay beautiful.

== Newfoundland ==
Wulff made his first visit to Newfoundland in 1935 when he fished for salmon on the Grand Codroy River, northeast of Channel-Port aux Basques. In 1946 he established fishing camps at River of Ponds and Portland Creek with the idea of sharing clients with Ella Manuel at Killdevil Lodge near Lomond (where her sons Antony Berger and Jonathan Berger spent their summers). Wulff and Ella Manuel were married in Corner Brook in 1947, shortly after he obtained his pilot's license. He sold his camps in 1954. Wulff is credited with being one of the first people to suggest the establishment of what eventually became Gros Morne National Park.

== Joan Wulff ==
Although previously acquainted through some sportsman shows, Wulff worked with Joan Salvato Cummings in 1966 on a television film for ABC's The American Sportsman, on the subject of bluefin tuna fishing in Newfoundland. Joan was a world-class fly casting champion and avid fly angler. Later that year they worked together on another episode of The American Sportsman on bass fishing in Florida. Despite Lee's three divorces and Joan's previous marriage, Lee and Joan were married in 1967. They settled with Joan's two boys, Douglas and Stuart, in Keene, New Hampshire.

== Wulff School of Fly Fishing ==
The Wulffs moved from New Hampshire in 1978 to set up home in Lew Beach, New York, on the Beaverkill River. In 1979, they founded the Wulff School of Fly Fishing on the Beaverkill. According to the school's website, Joan explained the couple's reason for opening the school: "Lee's and my dream to share, with willing enthusiasts, the skills and lore of our wonderful sport. Lee will be with you through his words, films, and philosophy."

== Wulff series of dry flies ==
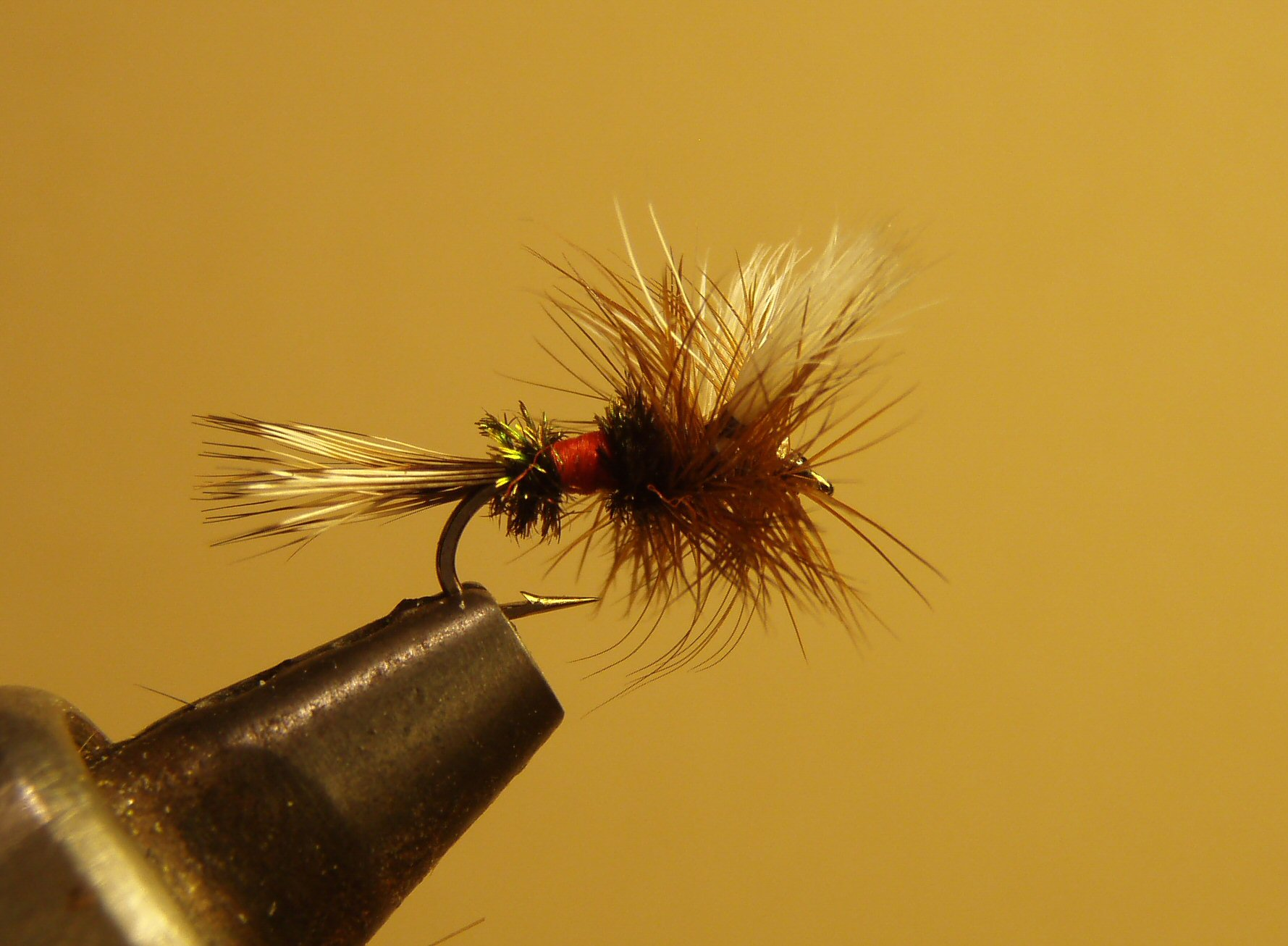
Royal Wulff dry fly

In 1930, Lee Wulff designed three innovative dry flies to fish with on the Esopus and other Catskill rivers. They were high-floating, full-bodied flies with hair wings and tails, which proved exceptionally effective for trout and salmon in fast rivers. At the time, Wulff was fishing regularly with Dan Bailey, and both men were tying and selling flies in their spare time to supplement their incomes. Wulff considered the traditional English and Catskill style dry flies far too skinny and "anemic" to be effective for American trout, so he chose to create his own stocky, robust style of fly.

Wulff collaborated with Bailey during the development of his dry fly patterns, and by the end of 1930 there were six patterns in the series: the Grey Wulff, White Wulff, Royal Wulff, Blonde Wulff, Brown Wulff and Black Wulff. He introduced the series to Ray Bergman, another fly angler and outdoor writer who became the Fishing editor for Outdoor Life magazine. Bergman embraced the flies and included them in his two editions of Trout magazine (1938, 1952).

The Wulff flies were designed by Lee Wulff and fill a decided need in large sizes. I consider them necessary to the well-balanced fly box. New Wulff patterns, Black Wulff and Grizzly Wulff [designed by Dan Bailey] have been added to my color plates because they are considered very important by fishermen in the Rockies as well as other sections.

— Ray Bergman, Trout (1952)

The Wulff flies, especially the Royal Wulff, remain a staple in anglers' fly boxes around the world. Angler and writer John Gierach believed the Royal Wulff to be one of the most popular dry patterns of the second half of the twentieth century.

== Death ==
Wulff died on April 28, 1991, near Hancock, New York, when the Piper Super Cub he was piloting crashed into trees at the end of the runway during a landing. He was on a check-ride with his flight instructor Max Francisco. Wulff was pronounced dead at the crash site. Francisco survived the crash but with very serious injuries. He was located about 30 minutes after the crash and helicoptered to a nearby hospital. He made a full recovery and was able to fly again. Francisco related that he believed Wulff, a pilot with 44 years' experience, had lost control of the plane because of an acute medical situation and was possibly dead at the controls when the plane crashed.

"I will always believe that Lee's death was the cause of the accident—rather than a result of it."

— Max Francisco

Obituaries in The New York Times, The Guardian and other major newspapers were full of praise for Wulff and his life and career. Shortly after Wulff's death, Charles Kuralt (then host of the CBS television show Sunday Morning) publicly commented: "Lee Wulff was to fly fishing what Einstein was to physics." Nelson Bryant, longtime outdoor editor of The New York Times, often called the dean of outdoor writers, wrote of Wulff:

Mr. Wulff's contributions to American fly fishing were fundamental and diverse. He probably did more than any other angler to popularize dry fly fishing for salmon, and his Wulff series of hair-wing dry flies were among those of that genre that, according to Paul Schullery in the book "American Fly Fishing," revolutionized salmon fishing on this side of the Atlantic.

— Nelson Bryant, New York Times, April 30, 1991

Outdoor writer and humorist Ed Zern wrote in his tribute to Wulff during a memorial at the New York Angler's Club on June 25, 1991:

... And so we salute this pioneer, this explorer, this adventurer, this innovator, this artist, this conservationist, this film maker, this author, this realist, this defender of sport's best traditions, this iconoclast of obsolete traditions, and above all, this great American sportsman.

— Ed Zern, June 25, 1991 at the New York Angler's Club

== Bibliography and other works ==
- Lee Wulff's handbook of freshwater fishing. New York: Frederick A. Stokes Company. 1939.
- Let's Go Fishing. New York: Frederick A. Stokes Company. 1939.
- Leaping Silver: Words and Pictures on the Atlantic Salmon. New York: George W. Stewart. 1940.
- Sports Photography. New York: A.S. Barnes. 1942.
- Lee Wulff's New Handbook of Freshwater Fishing. Philadelphia: J. B. Lippincott Company. 1951.
- The Atlantic Salmon. New York: A.S. Barnes. 1958.
- Gingrich, Arnold, ed. (1966). "Throw It Out There". American Trout Fishing by Theodore Gordon and a Company of Anglers. New York: Alfred A. Knopf. pp. 93–101.
- Gingrich, Arnold, ed. (1966). "The Art of Wading". American Trout Fishing by Theodore Gordon and a Company of Anglers. New York: Alfred A. Knopf. pp. 231–237.
- The Sportsman's Companion, A Compendium of Advice on How to Identify, Stalk, Fish and Hunt for North American Fish and Game. New York: Harper & Row. 1968.
- "Marlin on a Fly Rod". The American Sportsman. Vol. 1. New York: The Ridge Press. Spring 1968. pp. 4–11.
- "Muskeg, Meadowland, Forest, Moose and Caribou". The American Sportsman. Vol. 1. New York: The Ridge Press. Fall 1968. pp. 44–47.
- "The Best Way to Hunt Whitetail". The American Sportsman. Vol. 2. New York: The Ridge Press. Fall 1969. pp. 4–11.
- "...as American as bait casting". The American Sportsman. Vol. 3. New York: The Ridge Press. Summer 1970. pp. 4–11.
- Fishing with Lee Wulff. New York: Knopf. 1972. ISBN 0-394-46920-8.
- Migel, Michael J., ed. (1977). "The Masters on the Dry Fly". The Dry Fly for Atlantic Salmon-Beginnings, Best Times and Presentations. New York: J.B. Lippincott. pp. 211–222. ISBN 0-397-01188-1.
- Craig Woods; David Seybold, eds. (1982). "An Angler's Perspective". Waters Swift and Still - A prize catch of new fly-fishing stories by America's most renowned angling writers. Tulsa, Oklahoma: Winchester Press. ISBN 0-87691-357-5.
- Wolverton, Mike; Wolverton, Barbara, eds. (1984). "The Wealth of Age". Fly Fishing Always. Federation of Fly Fishers. pp. 20–26. ISBN 0-9614193-0-X.
- Lee Wulff on Flies. Mechanicsburg, Pennsylvania: Stackpole Books. 1980. ISBN 0-8117-0953-1.
- "In Quest of a Name for Outdoor Purists". The New York Times. April 21, 1985.
- "Fishing in Europe with Ties to the Past". The New York Times. June 17, 1985.
- Trout on a Fly. New York: The Lyons Press. 1986. ISBN 1-55821-076-8.
- Repine, Jim; Wulff, Lee (1988). How to Fly Fish Alaska. Portland, Oregon: Frank Amato. ISBN 0-936608-68-4.
- The Compleat Lee Wulff-A Treasury of Lee Wulff's Greatest Angling Adventures. Boston, Massachusetts: Dutton Adult. 1989. ISBN 0-525-24796-3.
- Merwin, John, ed. (1992). Salmon on a Fly: the Essential Wisdom and Lore from a Lifetime of Salmon Fishing. Riverside, New Jersey: Simon & Schuster. ISBN 0-671-76065-3.
- Lee Wulff-Bush Pilot Angler. Camden, Maine: Down East Books. 2000. ISBN 0-89272-480-3.
  - Posthumously published journal of his flying and fly-fishing off the coasts of Labrador and Newfoundland in the 1940s and 1950s.

=== Audio and video ===
- Lee Wulff (1947). Wings for an Angler (Video recording). Lee Wulff.
- Lee Wulff (1958). Salar, The Leaper (Film). RKO Pathe.
- Lee Wulff and Curt Gowdy (1986). Minipi trout [videorecording] featuring Curt Gowdy & Lee Wulff (Video recording). Joan & Lee Wulff, Inc.
- Lee Wulff (1988). Afield with Lee Wulff (Audio cassette). Audio Press.

== Sources ==
- Samson, Jack (1995). Lee Wulff. Portland, Oregon: Frank Amato. ISBN 1-57188-019-4.
- Bryant, Nelson (May 21, 1991). "Ability to woo fish and anglers alike". The New York Times.
- "International Game Fish Association Hall of Fame - Lee Wulff". International Game Fish Association.
- Jones, Stephen. "Lee Wulff." Lee Wulff. Yale Library, May 2010. Web. December 5, 2011.
- Black, William C. (2010). "Lee Wulff, Bigger Than Life". Gentlemen Preferred Dry Flies-The Dry Fly and The Nymph, Evolution and Conflict. Albuquerque, New Mexico: University of New Mexico Press. pp. 273–282. ISBN 978-0-8263-4795-4.
- "IGFA Hall of Fame - Joan Wulff". International Game Fish Association.
- Wurtmann, Jon (December 5, 2011). "Joan Wulff, Saratogian". Wurtmann Advertising. Archived from the original on March 4, 2016.
- George, Nathan (Spring 2008). "Lee Wulff Innovator: The Fishing Vest and Plastic Flies" (PDF). The American Fly Fisher. Vol. 34, no. 2. Manchester, Vermont: American Museum of Fly Fishing. pp. 22–23. Archived from the original (PDF) on November 29, 2014.
- Alevras, John (Summer 2009). "Wulff and Hewitt: Light Tackle for Large Salmon" (PDF). The American Fly Fisher. Vol. 35, no. 3. Manchester, Vermont: American Museum of Fly Fishing. pp. 18–19. Archived from the original (PDF) on November 29, 2014.
