= Gary LaFontaine =

American fisherman

- Born: May 12, 1945
- Died: January 4, 2002 (aged 56)
- Spouse: Ardyce
- Writing career
- Genres: Outdoors, Non-fiction
- Subject: Fly fishing

Gary LaFontaine (May 12, 1945 – January 4, 2002) was a well-known fly fisherman and author. His books include Caddisflies, The Dry Fly: New Angles, Fly Fishing the Mountain Lakes, and Trout Flies: Proven Patterns. He died of Lou Gehrig's disease.

The nice part about fishing all the time is that an angler can spare moments for just sitting and watching the water. These spells don't even have to have a purpose, but it is hard not to discover some secrets during such interludes. The fisherman without a schedule doesn't need to rush about, casting furiously in a hunt for every possible trout. For this reason, he usually catches more of them.

— Gary LaFontaine, Trout Flies: Proven Patterns

== Early life ==
Growing up in Connecticut Gary LaFontaine caught his first fish at age eight using a fly. At age 15 he published his first fishing article. In 1963 he attended the University of Montana majoring in Behavioral Psychology. Gary and his wife Ardyce returned to Connecticut where she worked with mentally disabled children. They moved in 1973 to Deer Lodge, Montana where Gary worked as a guard at the Montana State Prison. He later took up a post in the children's ward at the historic Montana State Hospital in Warm Springs, Montana.

== Publishing ==
He worked with Stan and Glenda Bradshaw to form Greycliff publishing and a mail-order business called Book Mailer.

== Illness ==
His wife Ardyce died in 1994 from a long debilitating illness. It wasn't long until news that he had ALS spread throughout the flyfishing world. By 2000 he required the use of a wheelchair, but was still a prominent figure, attending conventions like the Federation of Flyfishers.

== Awards ==
It was in 1990 that he won the Arnold Gingrich Memorial Award for Lifetime Writing Achievements, after which he continued writing for another ten years. He was awarded Angler of the Year in 1996 by Fly, Rod and Reel magazine.

== Bibliography ==
Challenge of the Trout was his first book that was published in 1976 (no longer in print). His second book Caddisflies gained him national recognition in 1981. The next book he published was The Dry Fly: New Angles in 1990. Then Trout Flies: Proven Patterns in 1993 and then Flyfishing Mountain Lakes in 1996.
