= Ed Zern =

- Born: Edward Geary Zern; December 13, 1910; Farmington, West Virginia, U.S.
- Died: March 25, 1994 (aged 83); Stamford, Connecticut, U.S.
- Education: West Virginia University; Penn State University
- Occupations: Writer; Humorist; Fisherman; Environmentalist; Conservationist

Edward Geary Zern (December 13, 1910 – March 25, 1994) was a writer, humorist, fisherman, environmentalist and conservationist. Zern was a popular columnist at Field & Stream Magazine.

== Early life ==
Zern was born in Farmington, West Virginia. His father was a professor at the School of Mines at West Virginia University and a mine inspector. Zern's father taught him flyfishing, and brought him along on mine inspections. On these visits, Zern saw the environmental damage of water pollution from mine tailings. A Boy Scout, Zern learned about hunting squirrels with a .22 rifle.

Zern attended Pennsylvania State University, graduating with a degree in English literature in 1932. Zern then took the $400 he had earned writing for the college newspaper and went to Paris, with the aim of writing a novel. After four months, Zern returned to the United States, having failed to write the novel. He then worked as a merchant seaman for 18 months. After his time at sea, Zern returned home and got married.

== Writing career ==
Living in Philadelphia, Zern became an advertising man and cartoonist. He produced a long series of humorous promotional ads and cartoons for Nash Motors.

After hearing Zern complain about the quality of sporting magazines, his wife suggested that he contribute articles himself. He wrote an article for Field and Stream and received $60, which was about twice his weekly income. He wrote a second article for them and received $75. Zern decided to become a full-time freelance writer.

After submitting several humorous articles to Collier's, a former editor there suggested that he write a book about fishing. Zern reportedly said, "To Hell With Fishing," and that became the book's title. Published in 1945, To Hell With Fishing sold hundreds of thousands of copies. Regarding the book, Zern was quoted as saying, "I don't think many fishermen bought it; people bought it to give to fishermen."

Continuing to write books and advertising copy, Zern became a contributing editor of the new Sports Illustrated magazine for four years. He was published in True, the travel section of the Sunday New York Times, The Flyfisher, Audubon, and other publications.

In November, 1958, Field and Stream first published Zern's "Exit Laughing" column. It remained a magazine feature for over 30 years .

== Conservation activities ==
Zern was a member of many conservation groups, including the Theodore Gordon Flyfishers (he was a past president), the Atlantic Salmon Federation, and the Boone and Crockett Club, an organization started by Theodore Roosevelt and others for the preservation of big game animals.

Zern was deeply involved in environmental issues and conservation, but excused his less-than-strident advocacy of these causes in print, saying, "I have problems being serious." He detested "game hogs" (hunters and fishers who take more than the limit), those who pollute the air and water, and he thought that a strong conservation ethic is about the finest trait any sportsman can possess.

In 1953, Zern created an annual Conservation Awards Program, originally sponsored by American Motors Corporation and later sponsored by Gulf Oil Corporation. The awards were presented annually to 10 professional conservationists employed by nonprofit organizations, and to 10 persons whose conservation efforts were voluntary. As of 1983, Zern himself was still the program director for the award. At the time of his death, it was known as the Chevron/Times Mirror Magazines Conservation Award.

== Humor and style ==
According to Brook Zern, his father's absurd humor showed a "well-disguised intellectualism ... The main reason that Ed Zern is not listed up there with S. J. Perelman, Robert Benchley, E. B. White and Peter De Vries is because he wrote for the sporting set at Field & Stream instead of the smart set at The New Yorker."

in his articles for Field and Stream, Zern would casually mention Wagner (comparing his operas to big game hunting), Bach (trout fishing with a dry fly), Proust and Joyce. He once included an offhand "book review" of "Lady Chatterley's Lover":

Although written many years ago, Lady Chatterley's Lover has just been reissued by Grove Press, and this fictional account of the day-to-day life of an English gamekeeper is still of considerable interest to outdoorminded readers, as it contains many passages on pheasant raising, the apprehending of poachers, ways of controlling vermin, and other chores and duties of the professional gamekeeper. Unfortunately one is obliged to wade through many pages of extraneous material in order to discover and savor these sidelights on the management of a Midland shooting estate, and in this reviewer's opinion this book can not take the place of J. R. Miller's Practical Gamekeeping.

In To Hell With Hunting, Zern said that he once had to explain to a visitor what "restricted" meant on the signs for hunting and fishing lodges. "'It means,' I told him, 'that if you are a game-hog and a spoil-sport and a discourteous scoundrel and a Gentile, you are welcome to stay there, and if you are a true sportsman and a conservationist and a gentleman and a Jew, you are not welcome.'" Zern continued, editorially: "Personally, I believe wholeheartedly in "discrimination"— against game-hogs, fish-hogs, violators of the written and the unwritten laws of sportsmanship, conservation, decency, and courtesy. But I don't want to be welcomed to a hunting or fishing camp or hotel simply because I am a Pennsylvania Dutchman, and I don't want some of the finest sportsmen I know to be turned away because they are Jews."

In his regular "Exit Laughing" column, Zern dealt with such absurdities as using hemp seeds for bait in England. Noting that marijuana impairs the faculties, he asked, "Is he fearful lest the local perch should fail their bar exams, or the pike flunk their courses in nuclear physics? If the I.Q. of an wandle barbel or roach or tench should slip from 1.6, which it normally is, to 0.7, for instance, I doubt the tight little island would get appreciably looser."

In the same column, Zern mentioned a fellow who dreamed he was a pileated woodpecker and awoke with a hangover (leaving the reader to imagine the effect of having a hangover and knocking one's head against a tree to find food. He told another "tall tale" of a fisherman who pulled on his line so hard that "the fish was turned completely inside out."

== Family and death ==
Zern died on March 25, 1994, of Parkinson's disease. Typically for him, he made jokes about his ailment, saying, "I shake a lot. But it keeps my wristwatch wound." He also claimed that his shaking hand caused a tied fly to more closely resemble a real insect when in the water.

Zern was survived by his companion, Sandra Weiner; his daughter, Erica; son, Brook; brother, Gordon; and two granddaughters. His wife, Evelyn Mencken (1912–1978), whom he married in 1937, predeceased him.

== Legacy ==
When Zern retired from Field and Stream in 1993, the magazine's managing editor, Maggie Nichols, said, "No one could possibly take Ed's place." "Exit Laughing" disappeared from the back page of the magazine. However, "out of respect for sales", his old columns began to be reprinted.

== Books ==
- To Hell With Fishing (1945)
- To Hell With Hunting (1946)
- How to Tell Fish From Fishermen; or, A Plague on Both Your Houses (1947)
- How To Catch Fishermen (1951)
- Zane Grey's Adventures in Fishing [Editor] (1952)
- Are Fishermen People? (1955)
- A Fine Kettle of Fish Stories (1972)
- Hunting and Fishing from A to Zern (1985)
- The Best of Ed Zern: Fifty Years of Fishing and Hunting from One of America's Best-Loved Outdoor Humorists (2001)
