= Scientific Anglers =

- Industry: Fishing Tackle
- Founded: 1945
- Founder: Leon Martuch, Clare Harris, and Paul Rottiers
- Headquarters: Midland, Michigan
- Area served: International
- Products: Fishing Tackle
- Parent: Orvis
- Website: www.scientificanglers.com

Scientific Anglers is a fly fishing company specializing in a variety of fly fishing tackle products. Scientific Anglers is noted for the invention of PVC coated floating fly line and continued innovations in fly line cores and coatings. Scientific Anglers's products currently include a variety of lines, fly boxes, reels, and fly fishing educational materials.

== History ==
Scientific Anglers was founded in 1945 in Midland, Michigan. Scientific Anglers' notable developments include the introduction of PVC coated designs of contemporary floating fly lines in 1952 and the development of sinking fly lines in 1960. Their introduction of PVC coated fly lines was largely responsible for the decline of the old line sizing system that used letters—HCH—to designate the taper and weight of silk fly lines. Because PVC coated lines were significantly different from silk lines, a new system evolved that identified lines with their grain weight in the first 30 feet of line (i.e. 5 wgt) and a two letter designation—DT (Double Taper), (ST-Single Taper) or (WF-Weight Forward) to identify the line taper.

Scientific Anglers is subsidiary of Orvis, and currently has a design lab in Midland, Michigan.
