= List of pseudonyms of angling authors =

Since the 18th century, hundreds of angling authors have adopted pseudonyms for their books, for their contributions to journals and the popular press. Pen names for angling authors were most common in the late 19th and early 20th centuries. Entries are listed by pen name, real name, and works.

- The Amateur Angler, Edward Marston
- The American Angler, John J. Brown Brown wrote the American Angler’s Guide (1845), the first book-length guide for angling published in the United States.
- Athenian, Harry.G.McClelland. McClelland is famed for this book The Trout Dresser's Cabinet of Devices, or How to Tie Flies for Trout or Grayling Fishing (1898), which was published after his death by The Fishing Gazette for which he wrote articles under his pseudonym.
- Badger Hackle, Theodore Gordon, early American Catskill angler.
- Barnwell (or Ira Zell), Robert Barnwell Roosevelt, author of Superior Fishing; or The Striped Bass, Trout, Black Bass and Bluefish of the Northern States (1865) and other titles.
- Christopher North, John Wilson, a Scottish author associated with Blackwood's Magazine.
- Clericus, William Cartwright
- Clifford, Charles, William Henry Ireland, author of The angler: a didactic poem (1804) and noted forger of Shakespearean papers.
- Cotswold Isys, Richard H. Glover
- Detached Badger, Frederic M. Halford, noted British author of Floating Flies and How To Dress Them (1886) and others on Dry Fly Fishing.
- Ephemera, Edward Fitzgibbon, British author of The Book of the Salmon (1850) and others.
- Fennel Hudson, Nigel Hudson, British author of Fly Fishing (2009), Traditional Angling (2010), and Wild Carp (2009).
- Fisher, Paul, William Andrew Chatto, British author of The angler's souvenir (1835, 1845, 1847)
- Frank Forester, F.F., of the Cedars, Henry William Herbert, British author of The Fish and Fishing of the United States (1850).
- Geoffrey Mortimer, Walter M. Callichan
- Ghanrhos, L.J. Graham-Clark, British fly tyer and contributor to The Field
- Grapho, John Harrington Keene, American author of Fly Fishing and Fly Making for Trout (1887)
- Greendrake, Gregory, J. Coad, British author of The angling excursions of Gregory Greendrake Esq. (1832)
- Greydrake, Geoffery, Thomas Ettingsall, contributor to The angling excursions of Gregory Greendrake Esq. (1832)
- Hampshire Fisherman, Richard Clark Sewell, British writer with contributions to The Field
- Hi-Regan, John Joseph Dunn
- I.D. Esquire, John Dennys (d. 1609) The Fisherman's "Glorious John" (see Westwood, Thos. Bibliotheca Piscatoria, 1861) Author of earliest English poetical treatise on fishing, The Secrets of Angling, first published in 1613.
- Jim-Jam, James C. Mottram, English author of Fly Fishing, Some New Arts and Mysteries (1915)
- John Bickerdyke, C. H. Cook, a prolific 19th-century angling author on coarse and sea fishing
- Jock Scott, Donald Rudd, author of Greased Line Fishing for Salmon
- John Chalkhill, Izaak Walton, author of The Compleat Angler (1653)
- John Trotandot, George P. R. Pulman, British author of Vade mecum of fly-fishing for trout (1841) and others
- J. R. Hartley, Michael Russell, an author who wrote two books about fly fishing-- Fly Fishing: Memories of Angling Days and J. R. Hartley Casts Again: More Memories of Angling Days
- Kego-E-Kay, Fred Mather, American author of Men I have Fished With (1897)
- Klahowya, Orange Perry Barnes, author of Fly Fishing in Wonderland (1910)
- Lariat or (Sam Slocum), Charles Hallock, founder and proprietor of Forest and Stream, 1873–80, now Field & Stream
- Latouche, John, Oswald J. F. Crawford, British sporting writer, c. 1876
- Martindale, Charles White
- Oconomowoc, Dr. James A. Henshall, American angling author of Book of the Black Bass
- Old Log, Colonel Tickell, a contributor to The Field c. 1876
- Oliver, Stephen, William Andrew Chatto, British author of Scenes and recollections of fly-fishing, in Northumberland, Cumberland and Westmoreland (1834)
- Otter, A. J. Alfred, London, published three angling books in multiple editions between 1859 and 1878.
- Palmer Hackle, Robert Blakely, prolific British angling writer, 1846-1871
- Pelagius, Rev. M. G. Watkins, a contributor to The Field c. 1892
- Piscator, Edmund Goldsmid. Used in preface to 1885 ed. of John Dennys's The Secrets of Angling.
- Piscator, George Philip Rigney Pulman
- Red Quill, James Englefield, a frequent contributor to The Field c. 1899
- Red Spinner, William Senior, British author of Waterside sketches. A book for wanderers and anglers (1875) and others.
- Robert Traver, John D. Voelker, author of Trout Madness (1960) and Trout Magic (1974)
- Seaforth & Soforth, G. E. M. Skues, Skues was a British lawyer, author and fly fisherman most noted for the invention of modern-day nymph fishing and the controversy it caused with the Chalk stream dry fly doctrine developed by Frederic M. Halford.
- Skene-Dhu, Cecil Lang
- Sparse Grey Hackle, Alfred W. Miller, American author of Fishless Days, Angling Nights (1971) and prolific sporting columnist for the Wall Street Journal, New York Times and Sports Illustrated.
- The American Editor, Reverend George Washington Bethune, published first American edition of Isaac Walton's The Compleat Angler (1847)
- Theophilus South, Edward Chitty, British author of The Illustrated Fly Fishers Textbook (1845)
- The Professor, John W. McDonald, author of Quill Gordon (1972)
- The Wanderer, John Keast Lord
- Ubique, Parker Gillmore
- Val Conson, a legal abbreviation for Valuable Consideration was G. E. M. Skues's penname for his articles with The Fishing Gazette.
- Water Rail, Richard Walker, well known British angler and author
  - Other pseudonyms used by Skues include: Seaforth and Soforth, E.O.E., A Limity Dincombe, S.A.S., Simplex Munidishes, Spent Naturalist, W.A.G., B. Hinde, Unspoiled Child, Captain Stoke, A Fluker, Integer Vitae, Caunter Fordham, A Butt, and Current Colonel.

== See also ==
- Bibliography of fly fishing
