= Dry-Fly Fishing in Theory and Practice =

1889 book by Frederic M. Halford

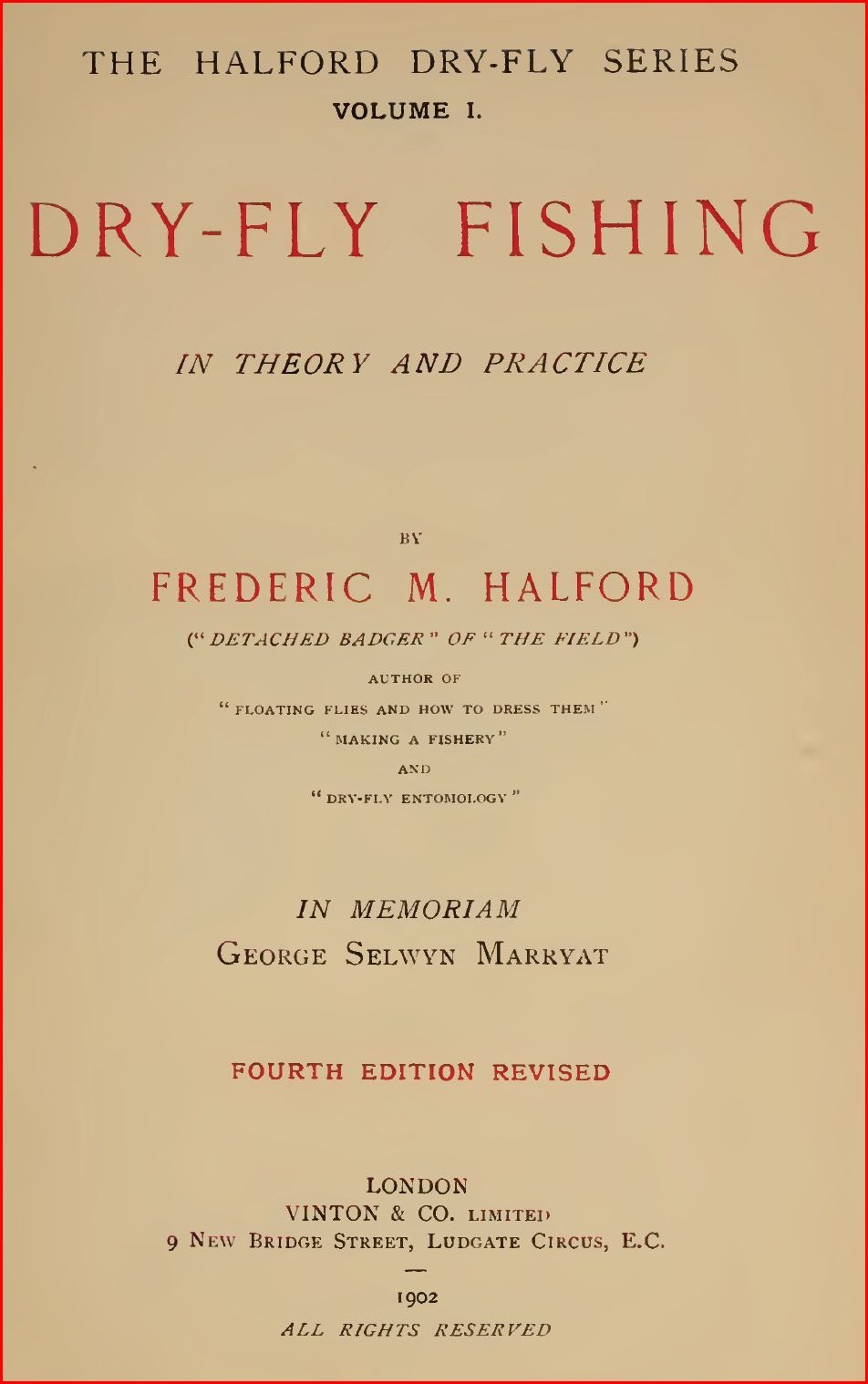
- Title page from 4th edition (1902)
- Author: Frederic M. Halford
- Language: English
- Subject: Fly fishing
- Publisher: Sampson Low, Marston, Searle, and Rivington, London
- Publication date: 1889
- Pages: 289
- Preceded by: Floating Flies and How to Dress Them (1886)
- Followed by: Making a Fishery (1895)

Dry-Fly Fishing in Theory and Practice (1889) is British author and angler Frederic M. Halford's second and most influential book on dry fly fishing. It followed Floating Flies and How to Dress Them (1886) and this pair of books initiated some 40 years of a rigid, and sometimes dogmatic school, the Halfordian school, of dry fly fishing, especially on English chalk streams. The work also played a significant role in the development of dry-fly fishing in America.

== Synopsis ==
Whereas Floating Flies and How to Dress Them is about the dry fly, fly tying and to some extent the entomology of the chalk stream, Dry-Fly Fishing... is about fishing the dry fly. It is a "how-to" manual for the dry-fly fisherman. It is not only about methodology, but also about the ethics of the dry fly fishing on English chalk streams.

The purists among dry-fly fishermen will not under any circumstances cast except over rising fish, and prefer to remain idle the entire day rather than attempt to persuade the wary inhabitants of the stream to rise at an artificial fly, unless they have previously seen a natural one taken in the same position.

— From Dry-Fly Fishing..., F. M Halford, 1889

The volume begins by spelling out the various pieces of fishing and personal equipment the dry-fly angler should possess. The pros and cons of different rod styles are discussed, along with fly lines, reels and the various miscellany a fly angler should carry. Although Halford did not invent dry-fly fishing, before this volume, no one had laid out in such detail the equipment recommendations needed to be a successful dry-fly angler.

Such were Halford's recommendations that they were routinely referenced by the fly-fishing trade:

The double taper dry-fly lines', dressed with pure linseed oil

under an air pump, exactly in accordance with Mr. Halford's directions on pages 24 and 25 in "Dry-fly fishing in Theory and Practice," are now perfected, and are pronounced

by everyone who has seen them to be the best dressed pure silk line in the market.

— From Walbran's Angler's Annual (1894), a fishing catalogue from Leeds, UK

A short, but concise Chapter 2 discusses the distinction between a floating (dry) fly and a sunk fly, with emphasis on the superiority of the floating fly as characterized by this concluding statement:

On one point all must agree, viz., that fishing upstream with fine gut and small floating flies, where every movement of the fish, its rise at any passing natural, and the turn and rise at the artificial, are plainly visible, is far more exciting, and requires in many respects more skill, than the fishing of the water as practised by the wet-fly fisherman.

— From Dry-Fly Fishing..., F. M. Halford, 1889

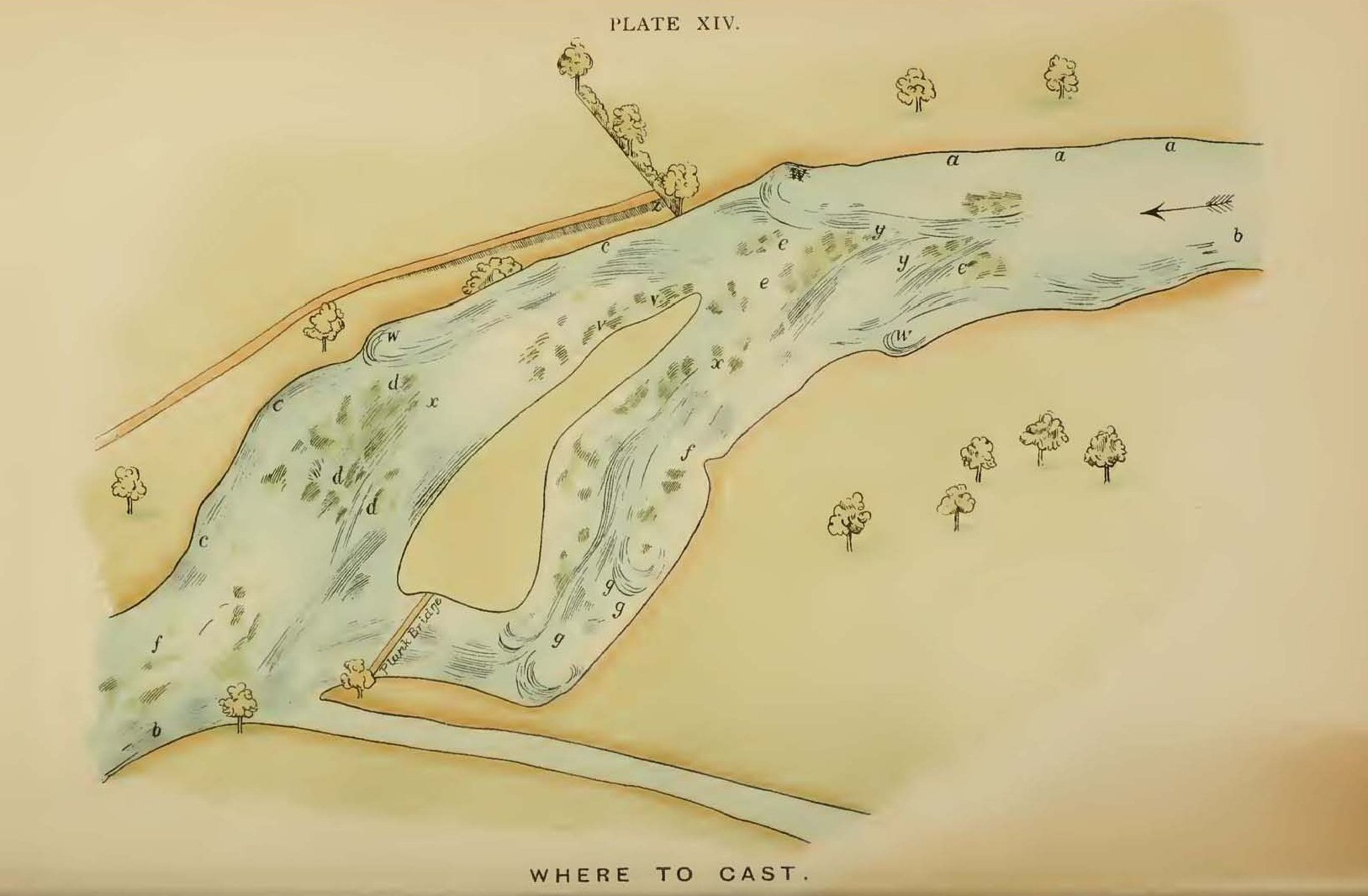
Plate XIV – Where to Cast

Chapters 3-5 go into great detail about how, when and where to cast the dry fly on the typical chalk stream. These chapters are heavily illustrated with casting techniques and comprise nearly 20% of the entire 1st edition.

The bulk of the remaining chapters deal with the entomology of the chalk stream, fly selection and trout behaviour.

== Reviews ==
- In 1894 The New York Times wrote of Dry-Fly Fishing in Theory and Practice:

And now I come to books which are nothing if not practical. Of these, Mr. F. M. Halford's “Floating Flies and How to Dress Them,” and his “Dry-Fly Fishing in Theory and Practice,” command the first place, as being, within certain limits, the best books on fishing with the artificial fly ever written. The limits are these. His books apply to the capture or brown trout and grayling only, salmon and sea trout being outside their purview.

- At some point in his career, Halford's great antagonist, G. E. M. Skues wrote of Dry-Fly Fishing...:

I think I was at one with most anglers of the day in feeling that the last word had been written on the art of chalk stream fishing.

— From The Essential G. E. M. Skues, Kenneth Robson, 1998

- In 1913, Emlyn M. Gill, writing for The New York Times said:

...when, in 1886, Mr. Halford published an important work on “Floating Flies and How to Dress Them.” he had practically a virgin field before him. His "Dry-Fly Fishing in Theory and Practice," published in 1889, became the standard work upon the subject.

- In the foreword to the Centenary edition (1989), Dermot Wilson, a leading authority on UK dry-fly fishing, points to the prophetic nature of Halford's Dry-Fly Fishing:

..the true value of the book is reflected by it overwhelming fascintation as the harbinger of an entirely new era in the history of fly fishing, the era in which every one of us lives today. It is the era in which the importance of entomology is at last fully appreciated. It is also, in spite of the addition of effective nymphs to our armoury, the era of the dry fly.

— From A History of Fly Fishing, Bark, 1992

== Influence on American fly fishing ==
Theodore Gordon, the acknowledged "Father of American dry-fly fishing", wrote extensively about the influence Halford had on his views.

We can never repay the debt we own to Mr. Frederic M. Halford... I bought "Floating Flies" and "Dry-Fly Fishing" when those books were first published, paying fifty cents on the shilling—just double the publisher's price—to procure them in the city of New York. These books were sources of much pleasure and profit to me, also some pain, as for a time I tried to follow their teachings indiscriminately, without proper due allowance for the different conditions under which my sport is pursued....I have read this fourth edition of Dry-Fly Fishing with great interest, and inclined to jot down a few of the impressions it has made upon me.

— Theodore Gordon, from The Fishing in Print, Arnold Gingrich

George M. La Branche in his seminal American fly fishing work The Dry Fly and Fast Water, wrote this of Halford's Dry-Fly Fishing:

For several years after my first experience with the floating fly I used it in conjunction with the wet fly, and until I read Mr. Halford's "Dry-Fly Fishing," when, recognising his great authority and feeling that the last word had been said upon the subject, I used the dry fly only on such water as I felt he would approve of and fished only rising fish.

— George M. La Branche, Dry Fly and Fast Water, 1914

== Contents ==
- Chapter I – The Dry-Fly Fisherman's Gear
- Chapter II – Floating Flies and Sunk Flies
- Chapter III – How to Cast
- Chapter IV – Where to Cast
- Chapter V – When to Cast
- Chapter VI – Studies of Fish Feeding
- Chapter VII – Circumstances Affecting the Angler's Sport
- Chapter VIII – Selection of Fly
- Chapter IX – Evening Fishing
- Chapter X – Hooking, Playing and Landing
- Chapter XI – Autopsy
- Chapter XII – Trout or Grayling?
- Chapter XIII – The Management of a Fishery

=== Illustrations ===
- Frontispiece – Landing a Trout
- Plate I – Grip of the Rod
- Plate II – Over-handed Cast-Backward Position
- Plate III – Over-handed Cast-Coming Forward
- Plate IV – Over-handed Cast-Forward Position
- Plate V – Downward Cut-Forward Position
- Plate VI – Under-handed Cast-Backward Position
- Plate VII – Under-handed Cast-Coming Forward
- Plate VIII – Under-handed Cast-Forward Position
- Plate IX – Steeple-Cast-Recovering the Line
- Plate X – Steeple-Cast-Backward Position
- Plate XI – Steeple-Cast-Coming Forward
- Plate XII – Dry Switch-Commencement
- Plate XIII – Dry Switch-Finish
- Plate XIV – Where to Cast-Illustrative Plan
- Plate XV – Mayfly-Eggs, Larve and Nymph-Coloured
- Plate XVI – Larva and Nymph Magnified
- Plate XVII – Sub-imago and Imago-Coloured
- Plate XVIII – Sub-imago Male and Female-Magnified
- Plate XIX – Imago Female Magnified
- Plate XX – Mayfly-Imago Male Magnified
- Plate XXI – Autopsy-Longitudinal Section of Trout
- Plate XXII – Nymph of Ephemeride, Caddis and Shrimp-Coloured
- Plate XXIII – Nymph of Ephemeride Magnified
- Plate XXIV – Caddis arid Shrimp Magnified
- Plate XXV – Management of a Fishery-Illustrative Plan

== Other editions ==
From Antiquarian Book Exchange

- Halford, Frederic M. (1889). Dry-Fly Fishing in Theory and Practice (Limited large paper (100) ed.). London: Vinton & Co. Limited.
- Halford, Frederic M. (1889). Dry-Fly Fishing in Theory and Practice (Second ed.). London: Sampson Low, Marston, Searle & Rivington.
- Halford, Frederic M. (1899). Dry-Fly Fishing in Theory and Practice (Third ed.). London: Vinton & Co. Limited.
- Halford, Frederic M. (1902). Dry-Fly Fishing in Theory and Practice (No. 1 of Halford Dry-Fly Series (4th revised) ed.). London: Vinton & Co. Limited.
- Halford, Frederic M. (1973). Dry-Fly Fishing in Theory and Practice (Field and Stream Club facsimile reissue ed.). Reading, UK: Barry Shurlock.
- Halford, Frederic M. (1989). Dry-Fly Fishing in Theory and Practice (Centenary ed.). London: H. F. & G. Witherby. ISBN 0-85493-178-3.
- Halford, Frederic M. (1994). Dry-Fly Fishing in Theory and Practice (Centenary 1889 reprint ed.). Devon, UK: Fly Fishers' Classic Library.
- Halford, Frederic M. (1996). Dry-Fly Fishing in Theory and Practice (Collectors ed.). Norwalk, Connecticut: Easton Press.
- Halford, Frederic M. (2010). Dry-Fly Fishing in Theory and Practice (Print on Demand ed.). Charleston, SC: Nabu Press.

== See also ==
- Bibliography of fly fishing
