= Prince Nymph =

Fishing lure design

- Artificial fly
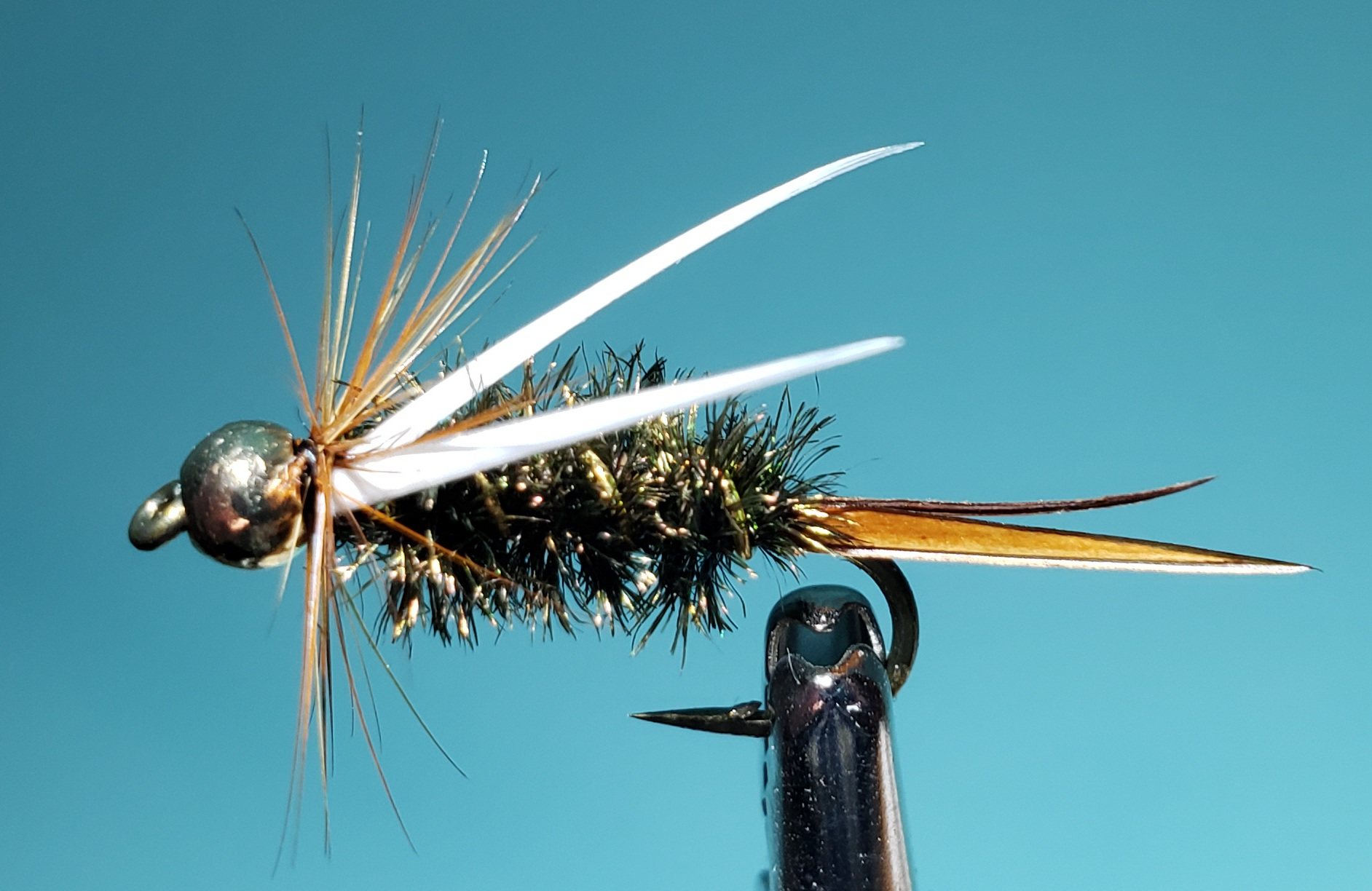
- Bead Head Prince Nymph
- Type: Nymph
- Imitates: attractor, possibly stone fly

History
- Creator: Doug Prince
- Created: 1930s
- Other names: Brown Forked Tail

Materials
- Typical sizes: 4–18
- Typical hooks: Nymph hook (TMC 5262; Mustad 9671; Daichi 7201; 2X long, heavy)
- Thread: Black 6/0 Danville, 70 Deniers for sizes 4–14; 8/0 for smaller sizes
- Tail: Black (original) or brown goose biots
- Body: Black ostrich herl (original) or Peacock herl; lead wire
- Wing: White goose biots
- Ribbing: silver wire (original); gold wire or oval tinsel
- Shoulder: black or brown hen neck hackle
- Head: thread
- Bead: Nickel or Tungsten (sized to hook: 5/32″ #8, #10 and #12; 1/8″ #12, #14 and #16; 3/32 #14, #16 and #18; 5/64″ #18-#22)

Uses
- Primary use: Trout

Reference(s)
- Pattern references: The Prince Family Tree, Ken McCoy (2021)

The Prince Nymph is a nymph attractor wet fly used in fly fishing. It was created by Doug Prince of Oakland, California, in the 1930s. It was originally known as the "Brown Forked Tail" and tied without a bead head and used black ostrich herl instead of peacock herl in the body. This fly is weighted. It is productive and popular fly and numerous variations have been created.

== Origin ==
The predecessor of the Prince Nymph was called the Brown Forked Tail, which was created by two brothers Don and Dick Olson of Bemidji, Minnesota, in the 1930s. This fly used a black goose-biot tail and white goose-biot wings. The wings were tied curved up from the body rather than down as in the Prince Nymph. This fly did not have a bead head and black ostrich herl was used in the body rather than peacock herl. Doug Prince of Oakland, California, adapted this fly to create the Prince Nymph, sometime in the 1940s. It appeared in Buz Buszek's fly fishing catalog in the 1940s with the name Prince Nymph for Doug Prince. A bead head and lead wire were later added. The wing was mounted with the biots curved down. This Prince Nymph or Bead Head Prince Nymph, as it is often called, is an attractor fly. Some fly fishers say it imitates a stone fly. It is often fished as a dropper below a dry fly.

== Tying ==
In order to give the fly weight, a gold tungsten or nickel bead is used behind the eye of the hook. Lead or lead free wire is wound around the hook to add additional weight for fishing in deeper pools. Black thread in 70 Denier, such as Danville 6/0, is used for hooks in size #4 to #14 or Danville 8/0 for smaller hooks. The most common size hooks that are fished are size #14 to #18. The tail of the fly was originally tied using black goose biots. Brown biots are often used for the tail, which is tied with the biots mounted on the side of the hook and curved outward. Peacock herl is now used for the body and gold wire or oval tinsel is counter-wrapped over the peacock herl. A white goose biot is wrapped on the shoulder with the concave surface facing down. A brown hen hackle is wrapped around the neck before whip finishing.

=== Variations ===
Alternate materials for the wings and body have been used to come up with numerous variations, such as the Go 2 Prince, Rainey's Prince, Dale's Crown Prince of Flash, Alison's Purple Wild Thing, Black Jack, Maldano's Casino Royal, Psycho Prince, and Purple Prince Charming.
