= George Selwyn Marryat =

Country gentleman and British angler

- Born: 20 June 1840; Chewton Glen, New Forest, Hampshire, United Kingdom
- Died: 14 February 1896 (aged 55)
- Resting place: Salisbury Cathedral; 51°03′53″N 1°47′51″W
- Education: Winchester College
- Known for: Fly fishing
- Spouse: Lucy Dorothea Clinton (1843 – 1911)
- Children: Mary Margaret, Dorothea Charlotte Edith, Joan O. Gladstone, and Alice Lucy
- Parent(s): Lieutenant Colonel George Marryat (1806–1871), Charlotte (née Selwyn) Marryat (1816–1860)
- Relatives: Frederick Marryat (Uncle)

George Selwyn Marryat (20 June 1840 – 14 February 1896) was a country gentleman and British angler most noted for his relationship with F. M. Halford, Francis Francis and the development of dry-fly fishing on the chalk streams of southern England. Upon his death in 1896, he became known as the "Prince of Fly Fishers".

== Early life ==
He was born George Selwyn Marryat on 20 June 1840 at Chewton Glen in the New Forest, Hampshire, England. He was the eldest son of Lieutenant Colonel George Marryat and Georgiana Charlotte (née Selwyn) Marryat. George was the nephew of Royal Navy officer and novelist Frederick Marryat.

In 1854, Marryat's family moved to Mapperton Manor, Dorset. In Dorset, on the River Frome at Maiden Newton, young Marryat learned to fish with the wet fly. He attended Winchester College from 1854 to 1858. Upon leaving Winchester, George gained a commission as a cornet in the Carabiniers on 16 March 1858. In October 1858, his regiment was posted to Meerut, India, to help quell the Indian Rebellion of 1857. The regiment returned to England in January 1862, and George was promoted, by purchase, to lieutenant. He sold his commission and resigned from the Army in 1865.

Marryat married Lucy Dorothea Clinton in St George's, Hanover Square, London on 9 July 1872. They had four daughters: Mary Margaret, Dorothea Charlotte Edith, Joan O. Gladstone, and Alice Lucy. Alice died shortly before her first birthday. The Marryats lived in Edinburgh, Scotland, for two years before moving to Shedfield, Hampshire.

== Fly angler ==
George Selwyn Marryat was a highly skilled English fly fisherman. He was an expert at casting, a knowledgeable amateur entomologist specializing in chalkstreams, and a developer of new fly-tying techniques.

== Meeting ==
What is often referred to as "the meeting that changed the course of fly fishing history" occurred when George Marryat first met a young Frederic M. Halford in Hammond's Fly Shop in Winchester on 28 April 1879. From that introduction came 16 years of collaboration with Halford on all aspects of dry-fly fishing the chalk streams of England.

About this period [1879] I took counsel of a friend, whose acquaintance I had made some short time previously, and who, in addition to being one of the best, if not the best dry-fly fisherman in England, was an adept in all the minutiee of dyeing, selecting, and preparing the materials, as well as the construction of artificial flies. To this friend, George Selwyn Marryat, I desire to express the deepest gratitude for the unwearying patience and perfect unselfishness with which he gradually inducted me into every detail known to him, and gave me the benefit of his invaluable experience, concealing nothing which would tend to perfect me in the art of imitating the various winged inhabitants of the stream.

— Frederic M. Halford, Floating Flies and How to Dress Them, 1886

== Development of the floating fly ==
Marryat wrote virtually nothing about the development the dry fly fishing at the time. However he fished for over a decade at the side of Frederick Halford and together they refined dry fly patterns into lighter, more realistic flies suitable for the equipment of the time. Marryat did share his patterns with Hammond's in London and they made their way into the stocks of commercial flies of the time. In his second book, Dry Fly Fishing: theory and practice (1889), Halford acknowledged his debt to Marryat's innovation and tutelage in the dedication.

... If these pages meet with the approval of our brother anglers; if they contain anything that is likely to be useful, anything that is new, anything that is instructive, or anything that is to make dry-fly fishing a more charming or more engrossing pursuit than it is now, the novelty, the instruction, and the charm are due to the innumerable hints that you have been good enough to convey to me at of different times during the many days of many years which we have spent together on the banks of the Test. As a faint acknowledgment of all these obligations, and as a mark of high esteem and deep affection, this humble effort to perpetuate your teachings, is dedicated to you by your grateful pupil.

— Frederic M. Halford, November 1888

Two dry flies of the time designed by and named for Marryat are the "Little Marryat" and "Marryat Quill".

== Death ==
In late January 1896, Marryat fell ill with influenza. Confined to his bed in his house at The Close, Salisbury, Marryat suffered a paralysing stroke that left him unconscious. He died on 14 February 1896. He is buried in the cloister garth of Salisbury Cathedral.

Shortly after Marryat's death, Major W. G. Turle, a close personal friend and noted angler (see Turle knot), wrote in the Fishing Gazette:

For twenty or more years Marryat and his Tam O' Shanter were a regular institution on the Test, and great was the sorrow expressed by rich and poor when it was heard we should see him amongst us no more. – A remarkable man, and one, perhaps, who has helped on dry fly fishing as much if not more, than any other man during the latter part of the century; and Marryat's doing's and Marryat's sayings will be remembered and repeated wherever the gentle craft is known and practiced in Great Britain, and possibly in many a distant colony besides.

— Major W. G. Turle, "Fishing Gazette", February 26, 1896
