= Brown Bi-visible =

- Artificial fly
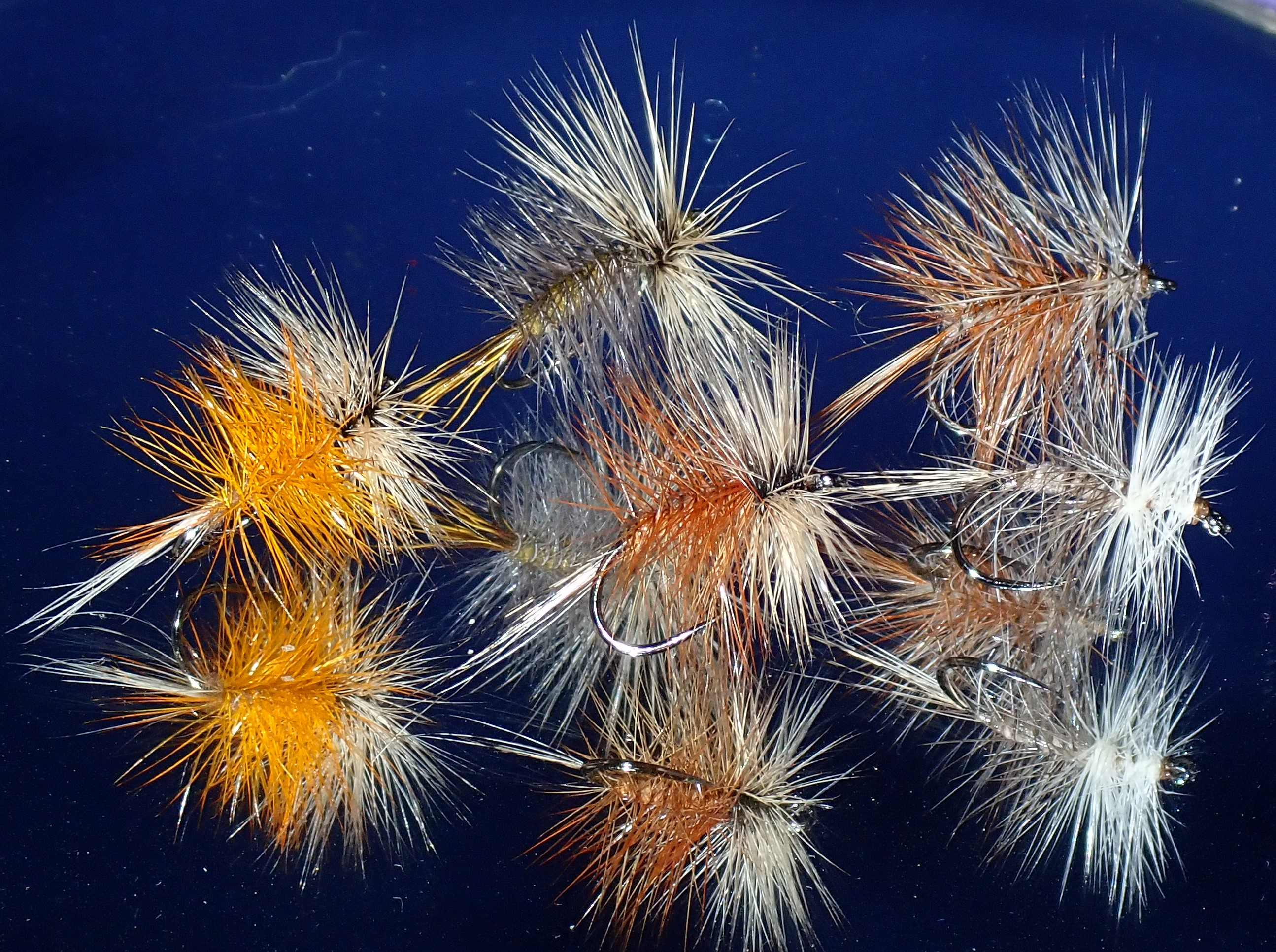
- Bi-visible dry flies
- Type: Dry fly
- Imitates: Adult mayflies, caddisflies, stoneflies

History
- Creator: Edward Ringwood Hewitt
- Created: 1920s

Materials
- Typical sizes: 8-18 standard dry fly
- Typical hooks: TMC 100, Firehole 419
- Thread: 6/0, 8/0
- Tail: Hackle fibers, CDL fibers
- Body: Rooster hackle, palmered
- Hackle: Cream or white dry fly hackle

Uses
- Primary use: Trout, Salmon

The Brown Bi-visible is an attractor style dry fly. The addition of light cream colored or white hackle at the front of the darker body made the Bi-visible easier for the angler to see on the water. Ray Bergman in his seminal 1952 work Trout gave the following credit to the Bi-visible pattern:

I gave Bivisible flies complete and indisputable credit. I believe that I even intimated they were the last word--the ultimate in dry flies. I was so sold on the Bivisibles for one complete season that if trout wouldn't take one, I figured they wouldn't take anything, and I was perfectly satisfied with this decision.

— Ray Bergman, Trout (1952)

== Origin ==
Edward Ringwood Hewitt believed darker colored flies were more easily seen by trout but were more difficult to see by anglers in low light conditions. The addition of light-colored cream or white hackle to the front of the darker brown palmered hackle made the fly more visible to both the trout and the angler.

In the 1930s and 1940s, prominent anglers and fly tiers like Ray Bergman, Rube Cross and Walt and Winnie Dettes promoted the Bi-Visible and created a number of variations. Rube Cross in The Complete Fly Tier (1936) dedicates an entire chapter to the Bi-visible style.

== Imitates ==
The Bi-visible is an attractor style dry fly. Flies are called attractor patterns because in theory, they do not resemble any specific prey, but instead attract strikes from fish. Paul Schullery in American Fly Fishing – A History (1996) explains however that although much has been written about the imitation theories of fly design, all successful fly patterns must imitate something to the fish, and even a perfect imitation attracts strikes from fish.

== Materials ==
- Hook-dry fly hook (size 8-18)
- Thread-black or brown
- Hackle-white or cream dry fly hackle
- Tail-brown hackle fibers
- Body-brown dry fly hackle wound full

== Variations ==
As described by Mike Valla in The Founding Flies

- Royal Coachman Bi-visible
- Badger Bi-visible
- Gordon Quill Bi-visible
- Blue Bi-visible
- Olive Bi-Visible
- Light Cahill Bi-visible
- Gray Grizzle Bi-visible
- Black Bi-visible
Bi-visible Dry Flies
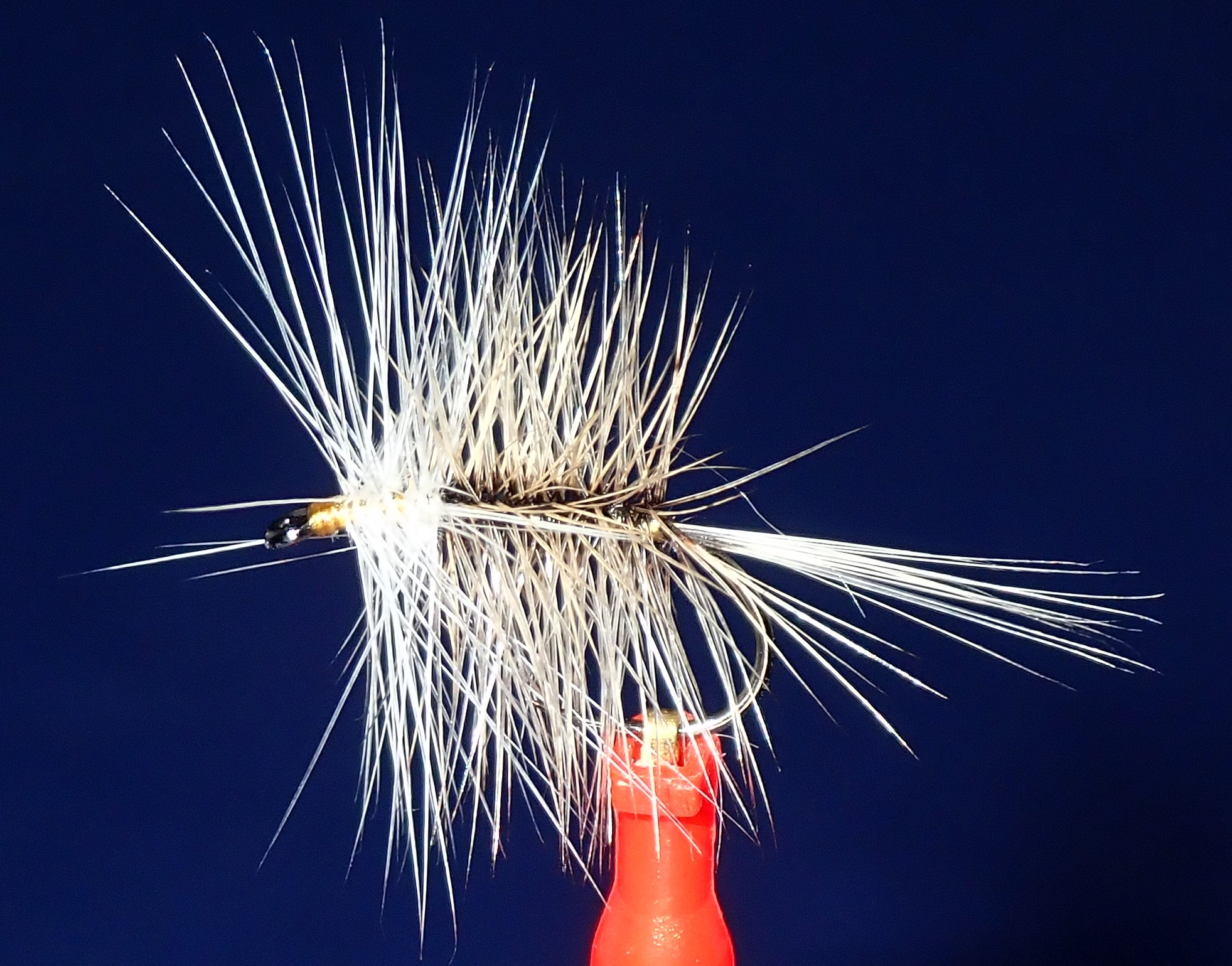
Badger Bi-visible

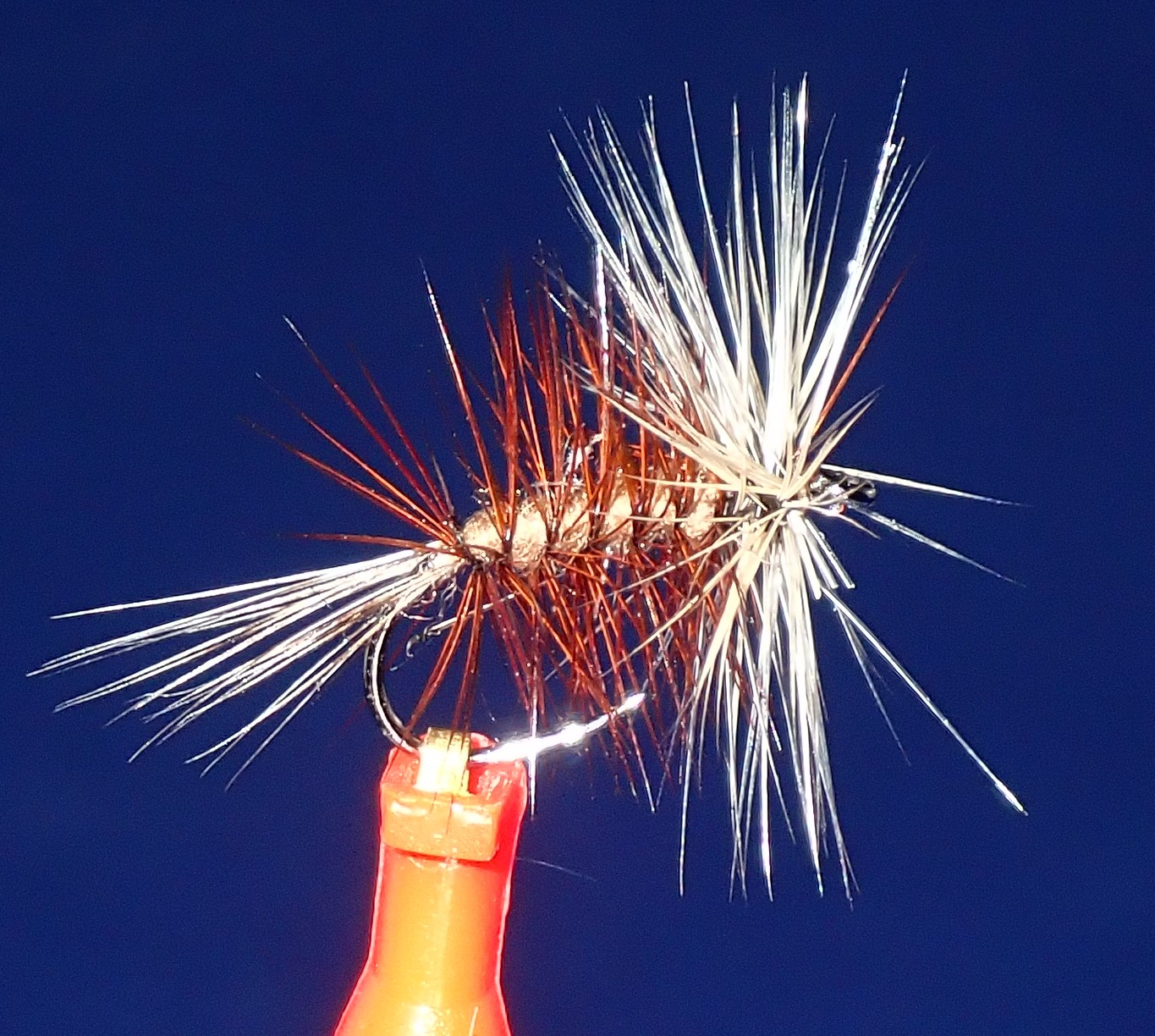
Brown Bi-visible

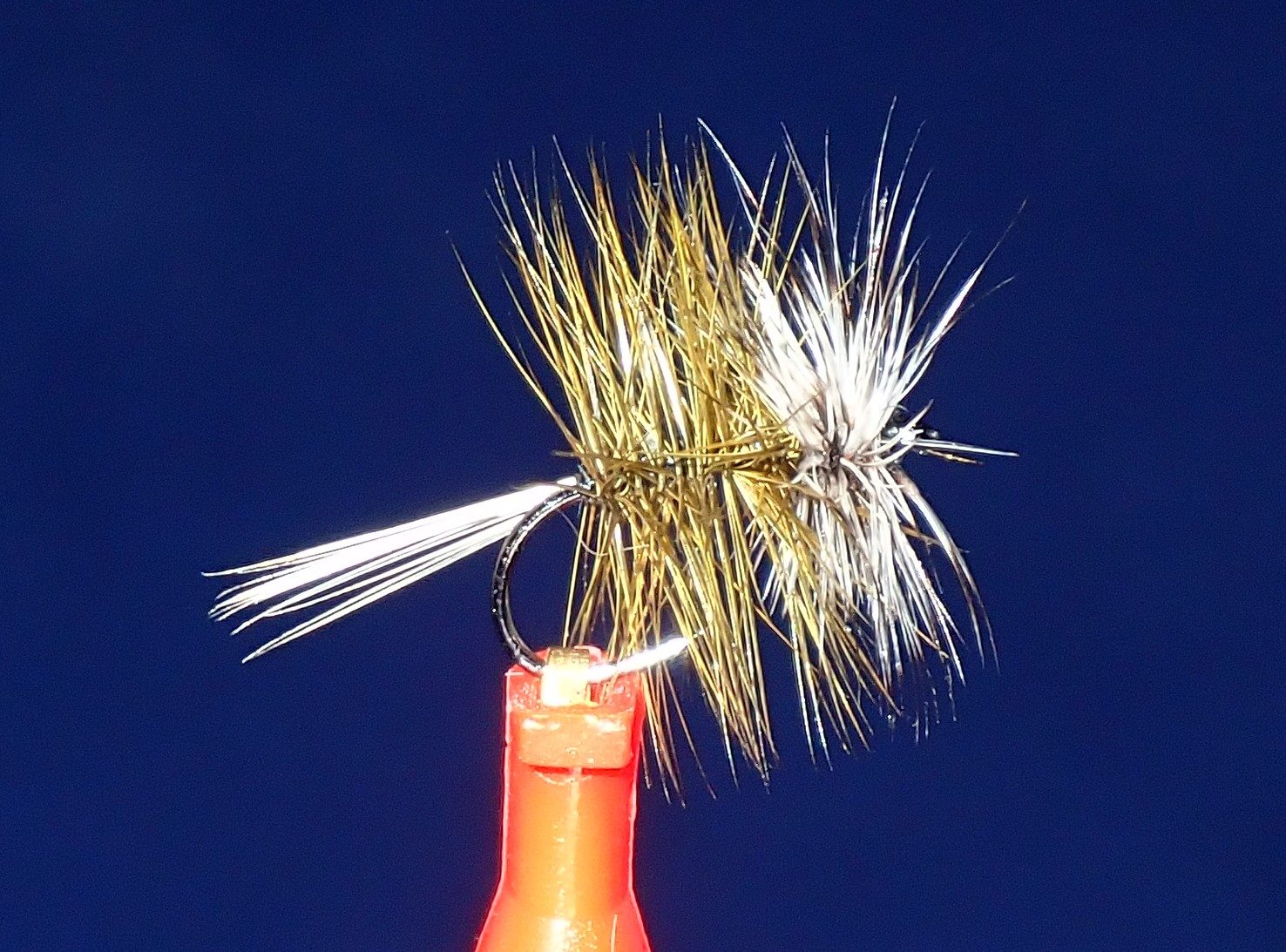
Olive Grizzly Bi-visible
