= Turle knot =

Fishing knot

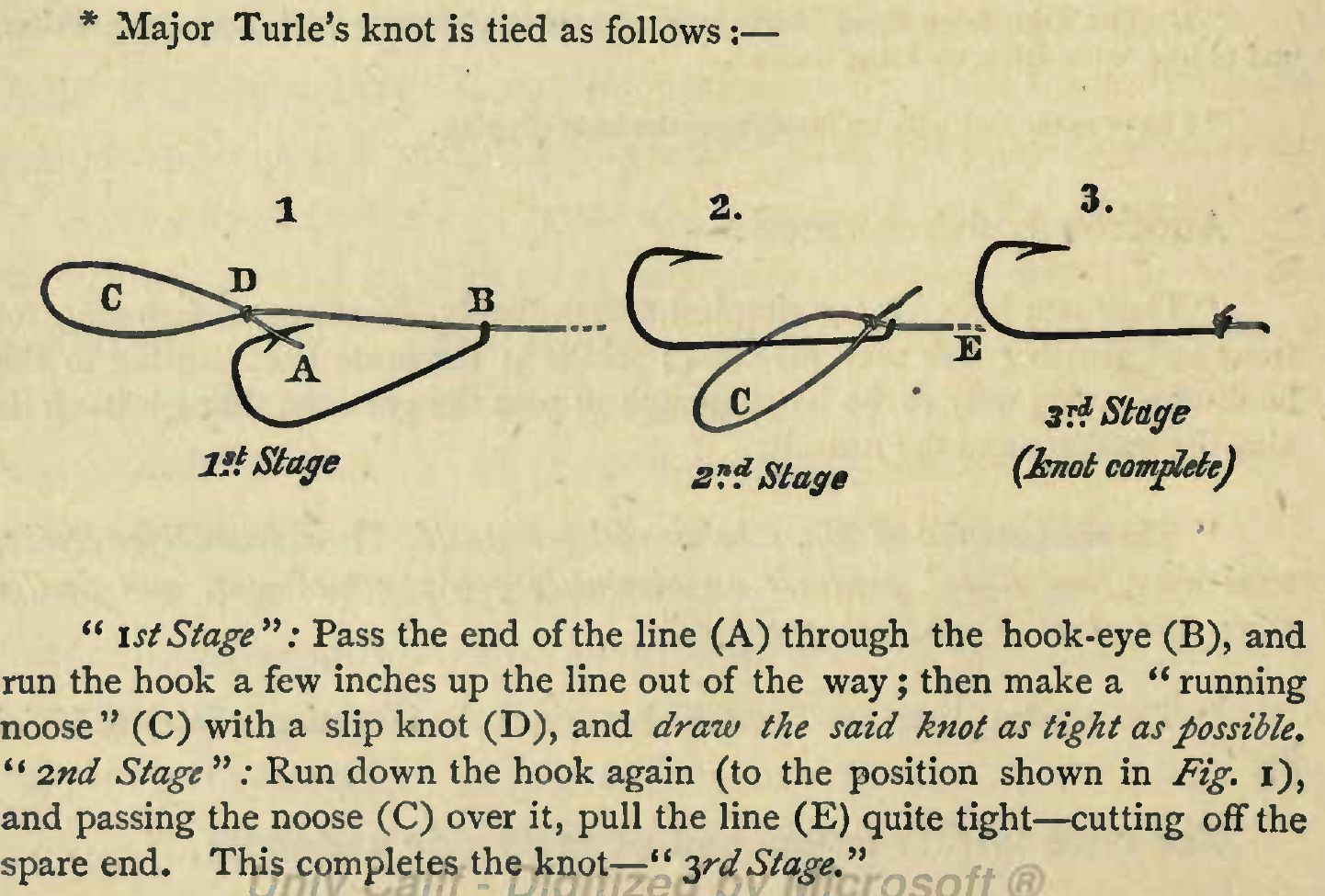
- The Turle knot as described in 1886
- Names: Turle knot, Major Turle's Knot
- Category: Hitch
- Typical use: Fishing

A turle knot is a knot used while fishing for tying a hook or fly to a leader. It is named after Major William Greer Turle, a 19th-century English angler who popularized the knot but did not claim to have invented it. Turle was a contemporary of Frederic M. Halford and fished the chalkstreams of Hampshire with Halford in the late 19th century and was an early pioneer in the use of eyed hooks for fly fishing. It has sometimes, wrongly, been referred to as the turtle knot.

H. Cholmondeley-Pennell is his 1886 edition of Modern Improvements in Fishing Tackle and Fish Hooks described the Turle Knot thus:

For attachment to a bare hook I have been hitherto in the habit of using a very ingenious knot invented by Major Turle, and known under his name.* Attached to the turn-down eyed hook it answers excellently well, as I can testify from experience, having used nothing else for many weeks in sea and river fishing, when the catch amounted to some thousands of whiting, mackerel, gurnets, flat-fish, &c., and also in legering and float-fishing on the Thames and Norfolk Broads for bream, roach, barbel, chub, perch, and gudgeon.

== See also ==
- List of knots
