= Theodore Gordon =

American fisherman and writer

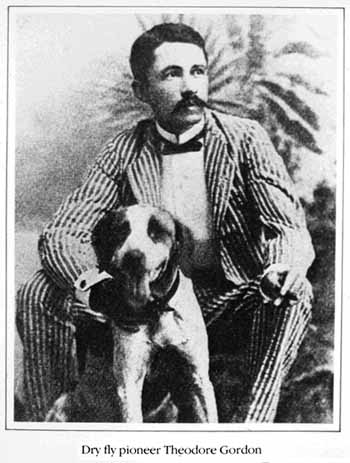
- Theodore Gordon: The father of American dry-fly fishing
- Born: September 18, 1854; Pittsburgh, Pennsylvania
- Died: May 1, 1915 (aged 60); Bradley, New York
- Occupations: Fisherman, writer

Theodore Gordon (September 18, 1854 – May 1, 1915) was an American writer who fished the Catskill region of New York State in the late 19th century through the early 20th century. Though he never published a book, Gordon is often called the "father of the American school of dry fly fishing". He wrote numerous articles for the Fishing Gazette from 1890 and published works in Forest and Stream from 1903, sometimes under the pseudonym Badger Hackle.

== Biography ==
Theodore Gordon was born in Pittsburgh, Pennsylvania on September 18, 1854.

Gordon had imported English fly-fishing tackle and flies. He altered the English flies to precisely match the insects hatching in the Neversink and Beaverkill rivers, and Willowemoc Creek. In the 1890s, he began developing his own fly patterns, and originated what is still referred to as the "Catskill" style of dry flies.

Gordon taught himself to tie flies by studying The American Angler's Book (1864) by Thaddeus Norris. He also read British fly fishing literature of the time and corresponded with notable British fly anglers Frederic M. Halford and G. E. M. Skues to perfect his fly tying skills.

Known as a consumptive hermit, Gordon lived his final years and died on May 1, 1915, in the Anson Knight house in Bradley, New York. This is one of the residences that had to be abandoned during the development of the Neversink reservoir, which flooded several former villages. It was developed to provide a water supply for New York City.

The Neversink and Delaware rivers are still known for fly fishing. John McDonald compiled Gordon's writing into the book The Complete Fly Fisherman: The Notes and Letters of Theodore Gordon (1947).

In the late 1800s Theodore Gordon began fishing the Neversink River in New York State. He represents the major figure in the transition from wet to dry-fly fishing in the United States. Although fishing with the dry fly had been mentioned by Thaddeus Norris in his The American Angler's Book (1865) and in several articles by other authors, Gordon became the great practitioner of the technique after he had received a number of dry flies from the Englishman Frederic Halford in 1890. Based on British insects, Halford's flies poorly imitated American hatches, but Gordon embraced the innovative technique and began the arduous study of native entomology that resulted in many indigenous patterns, including his most famous, the Quill Gordon.

— John McDonald, Quill Gordon, 1972
