= G. E. M. Skues =

British lawyer, writer and fly fisherman

- Photograph by Howard Coster, 1927
- Born: George Edward MacKenzie Skues; 13 August 1858; St. John's, Newfoundland
- Died: 9 August 1949 (aged 90)
- Monuments: Commemorative bench north of Winchester, on River Itchen
- Occupations: Lawyer, writer
- Known for: Nymph fishing
- Notable work: "The way of a trout with a fly" Minor Tactics of the Chalk Stream

George Edward MacKenzie Skues, usually known as G. E. M. Skues (1858–1949), was a British lawyer, writer and fly fisherman. He invented modern-day nymph fishing. This caused a controversy with the Chalk stream dry fly doctrine developed by Frederic M. Halford. His second book, The Way of a Trout with a Fly (1921) is considered a seminal work on nymph fishing. According to Andrew Herd, the British fly fishing historian, Skues:

was, without any doubt, one of the greatest trout fishermen that ever lived. His achievement was the invention of fly fishing with the nymph, a discovery that put a full stop to half a century of stagnation in wet fly fishing for trout, and formed the bedrock for modern sunk fly fishing. Skues' achievement was not without controversy, and provoked what was perhaps the most bitter dispute in fly fishing history.

— Dr. Andrew Herd

Paul Schullery, the American fly fishing historian, characterises Skues in Skues on Trout as:

...Skues has been described not only as the father of nymph fishing, but as the greatest fly fisher who ever lived. He was also a modest, humorous and warmly accessible writer whose writings never lost sympathy for this his fellow anglers. His self-deprecating and deceptively simple-sounding writings on trout and fly fishing remain among the wisest and most revealing in the sport's enormous literature.

— Paul Schullery, Skues on Trout, 2007

John Goddard in The Essential G. E. M. Skues wrote:

...I still look on Skues with considerable awe as, with out doubt, the greatest thinking fly fisher ever to put pen to paper. In this respect, he was way ahead of Halford as an observant and creative angler

— John Goddard, The Essential G. E. M. Skues, 1998

== Early life ==
Skues was born on 13 August 1858 in St. John's, Newfoundland, and was the eldest child of William MacKenzie Skues, at the time surgeon to the Newfoundland Companies. His mother's maiden name was Margaret Ayre. At the age of 3, his parents returned to Britain en route to work in India. He was left with and raised by his paternal grandparents in Aberdeen, Scotland, Langford and Wrington in Somerset. In 1872 he won a scholarship to Winchester, and left the school in 1877. It was at Winchester that Skues was introduced to fly fishing when, in 1874, he bought some hooks in Hammond's to catch minnows. Hammond's, an angling shop in Winchester, introduced Skues to fly fishing and his first attempt was made using an eleven-foot rod, a silk and horsehair line, and a Wickham's Fancy.

After leaving Winchester, Skues spent a year in Jersey with his parents before moving back to London to begin his career as a lawyer with the firm of James Powell. In 1895, Skues became a partner in the firm of Powell, Skues and Graham Smith, a position he held until 1940.

Skues's chalk-stream career began in 1887 with an invitation from a client to fish the Abbots Barton fishery on the Itchen. There he met and befriended Francis Francis, angling author (A Book on Angling) and angling editor for The Field, and started studying and writing about trout fishing in English chalk streams. His first article in the angling press appeared the following year under his pseudonym "Val Conson".

== Chalk stream experiences ==
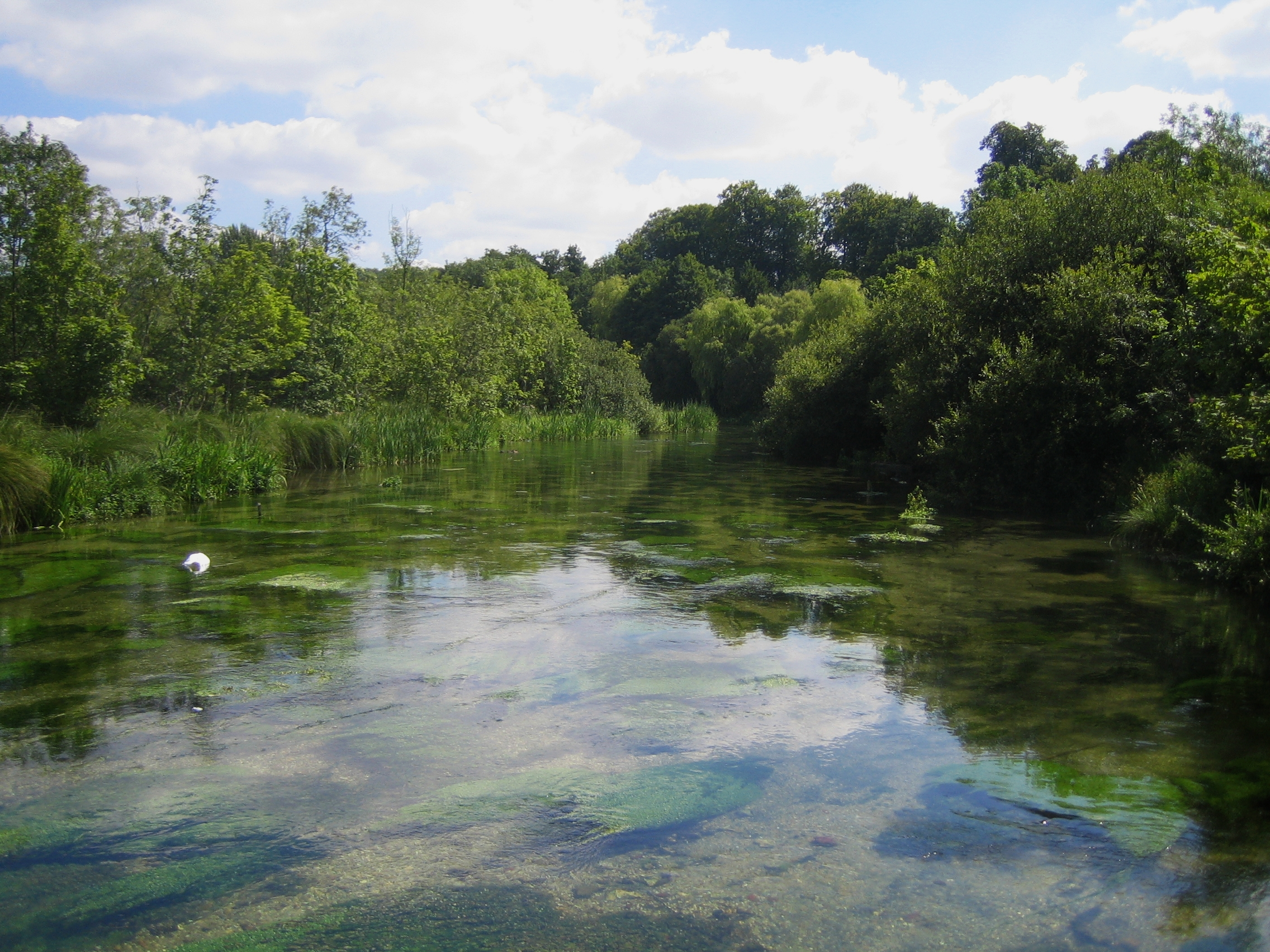
The River Itchen, a classic English chalk stream

Skues was to fish the Itchen every season until 1938. Until 1917, it was as a guest of his client, Irwin Cox. From 1917 to 1938, he was part of a syndicate with rights to the Barton Abbey fishery. In 1887 he acquired a copy of Frederic M. Halford's Floating Flies and How to Dress Them and that, along with his association with Francis Francis, was when he began his empirical exploration of upstream fishing with both dry flies and nymphs.

Skues obtained Halford's gospel-like Dry Fly Fishing in Theory and Practice in 1889 and had the pleasure of fishing for a week with Halford himself on the Itchen in 1891. As a result of that meeting, Halford, seconded by William Senior, editor of The Field, nominated Skues for membership in the Flyfishers' Club of London. He joined the prestigious club in 1893.

== Angling literature contributions ==
- Skues, G. E. M. (1910). Minor Tactics of the Chalk Stream. London: A & C Black.
- Skues, G. E. M. (1921). The Way of a Trout with the Fly: And some further studies in minor tactics. London: Adams and Charles Black.
- Skues, G. E. M. (1932). Side-Lines, Side-Lights & Reflection—Fugitive papers of a chalk-stream angler. London: Seeley Service.
- Skues, G. E. M. (1939). Nymph Fishing for Chalk Stream Trout. London: A & C Black.

=== Posthumous works by other editors ===
- Skues, G. E. M. (1950). Silk, Fur and Feather, The Trout-Fly Dressers Year. London: Fishing Gazette.
- Skues, G. E. M. (1951). Itchen Memories. London: Herbert Jenkins.

G. E. M. Skues's first book, Minor Tactics of the Chalk Stream, was published in 1910. In it, Skues carefully explored nymph fishing methodology during an era when the dry-fly school of Halford's was preeminent. He wrote the classic The Way of a Trout with the Fly in 1921. Numerous dry-fly men (including Frederic M. Halford) had observed that traditional winged wet flies represented no known underwater insect and declined to explore the possibilities – a naive decision as it turned out. Skues, on the other hand, was the first fisherman to make the point that the bulging rises which marked the first stage of the rise were caused by fish taking emerging nymphs – nymphs that could be imitated if new patterns and a new method were developed. He pointed out that it was only later that fish began to take adults, and that on occasion the fish were so full with nymphs that the rise was insignificant. Skues made the point that fishing wet flies or nymphs to fish didn't spoil dry fly fishing when adults were on the water and his most crucial discovery was that nymphing trout had to be struck, and that the timing of the strike depended on very subtle observation.

=== Pseudonyms ===
During his life, Skues used a variety of pseudonyms, especially for contributions to the sporting press. Among them were: Seaforth and Soforth, Val Conson, E.O.E., A Limity Dincombe, S.A.S., Simplex Munidishes, Spent Naturalist, W.A.G., B. Hinde, Unspoiled Child, Captain Stoke, A Fluker, Integer Vitae, Caunter Fordham, A Butt, and Current Colonel.

=== Halford vs Skues, dry fly vs nymph ===
Halford, along with Marryatt, perfected upstream dry-fly fishing in late 19th-century England and treated other forms of fly presentation, such as wet flies and nymphs on English chalk streams, with disdain. By the early 20th century, the Halford dry-fly doctrine had become cultish and to some extent dogmatic. The following passage by Halford epitomises his dogmatic views:

Those of us who will not in any circumstances cast except over rising fish are sometimes called ultra purists and those who occasionally will try to tempt a fish in position but not actually rising are termed purists... and I would urge every dry fly fisher to follow the example of these purists and ultra purists.

— From A History of Flyfishing, Bark, 1992

When Skues began promoting upstream nymphing techniques on English chalk streams at the turn of the 20th century, there was immediate tension between those who favoured and followed the Halford school of dry-fly fishing and those who chose to use other techniques. There is no evidence that there was ever any personal animosity between the two anglers, only verbal wrangling in the sporting press about the pros and cons of the two techniques. Indeed, Skues's second work The Way of a Trout with the Fly, which codified the upstream nymphing technique, was not published until 1921, well after Halford's death.

The debates continued into the 1930s. The Halfordian school claimed that upstream nymphing, although effective, was unethical and bad for the chalk streams, even to the point of banning the use of nymph on some fisheries, while Skues's proponents claimed that the dogmatic dry-fly approach limited opportunities when nymphing was a more appropriate technique. A culmination of sorts took place in February 1938 at the Flyfishers' Club when the so-called "Nymph Debate" took place. Skues was present to defend nymphing techniques, while many others, chiefly Sir Joseph Ball, defended the Halfordian doctrine. The result was decidedly in favour of Halford's dry-fly techniques to the exclusion of all others, but no one denied the effectiveness of Skues's nymphing methodology. The debate helped cement both Halford's and Skues's seminal roles in the development of modern-day fly fishing.
