= Frederic M. Halford =

British fisherman and writer (1844–1914)

Frederic Michael Halford
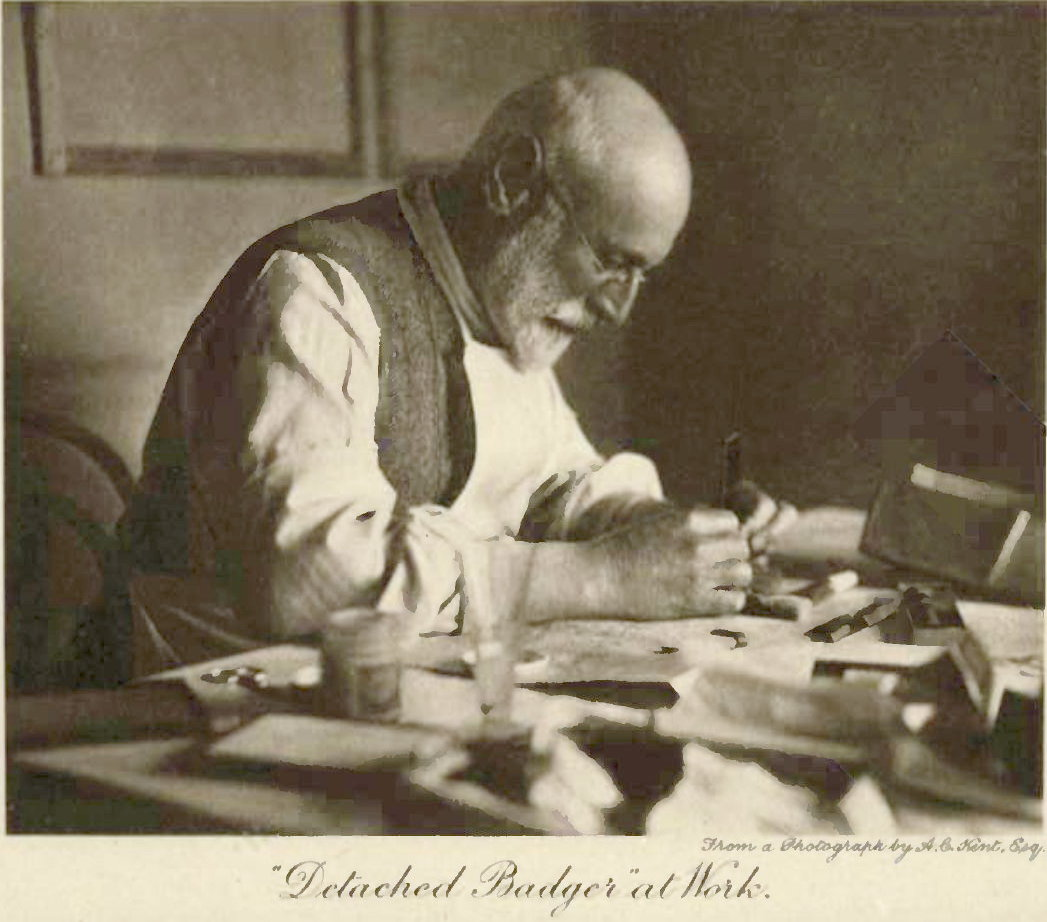
- Frederic M. Halford-Detached Badger tying flies
- Born: Frederic Michael Hyam; 13 April 1844; Birmingham, England
- Died: 5 March 1914 (aged 69); P&O liner Morea at sea on the River Thames
- Education: University College School
- Occupations: Businessman, angler, author
- Relatives: Samuel Hyam (1813–1891) (father), Phoebe Levy (mother)
- Writing career
- Pen name: Detached Badger
- Notable works: Floating Flies and How to Dress Them, 1886

Frederic Michael Halford (13 April 1844 – 5 March 1914), pseudonym Detached Badger, was a wealthy and influential British angler and fly fishing author. Halford is most noted for his development and promotion of the dry fly technique on English chalk streams. He is generally accepted as "The Father of Modern Dry Fly Fishing". John Waller Hills, A History of Fly Fishing for Trout (1921) called Halford "The Historian of the Dry Fly".

In Royal Coachman – The Lore and Legends of Fly Fishing (1999), Paul Schullery describes Halford:

...highly formalized code of how a dry fly should be fished, a code further developed and popularized later in the nineteenth century by one of fly-fishing's most eminent authors, Frederic Halford, whose first book, Floating Flies and How to Dress Them, was published in 1886 and took the upper-crust world of British fly-fishing by storm.

— Paul Schullery, Royal Coachman, 1999

== Early life to 1877 ==
Frederic Halford was born Frederic Michael Hyam into a wealthy Jewish family of German ancestry in 1844 in Birmingham, England. His parents, Samuel and Phoebe Hyam, moved to London when Frederic was 7. Samuel Hyam, and his brothers Lawrence and Benjamin, were very prosperous manufacturers of textiles and clothing in Birmingham, Leeds and Manchester. In 1875, all the Hyams changed their name to Halford.

At the age of 7, Halford began attending University College School (UCS) in London. When he left UCS in 1860 he went to work in one of the family businesses. Very little is known of his business career except that he retired from business at the age of 45 in 1889 to become a full-time angler. In February 1866, he became an officer in the 36th Middlesex Volunteers for a short period of time, during which he learned how to shoot.

His first experience of fishing was in a small London pond at the age of 6 and as a boy he fished the Serpentine and the Long Pool in Hyde Park. As a teenager, he regularly fished the Thames with conventional tackle for sea trout, bream, and pike. His largest fish was a Brown trout from the Thames that weighed 9.75 pounds (4.42 kg) in 1870.

Halford's first experiences in fly fishing were at the age of 24 in 1868 when, through the generosity of a family friend, he was given a free beat on the River Wandle, a pristine trout stream to the southwest of London.

In the late 1860s, the dry fly was in use to some extent on the Wandle, but as a fly-fishing technique it was in its infancy. Halford learned the basics of fly fishing on the Wandle, a river he fished regularly every summer until 1881.

== Chalk stream fly fishing ==
In 1877 Halford became a member of the Houghton Fly Fishers on the River Test. In 1879, in John Hammond's tackle shop in Winchester, Halford met angler George Selwyn Marryat, a meeting that was to change the course of fly-fishing history. They were to be friends for the remainder of Marryat's life. In 1880, Halford found accommodation at Houghton Mill, on the banks of the Test and, with Marryat, began his research for his first book, Floating Flies and How to Dress Them, published in 1886. Halford wanted Marryat to be joint author of the book, but Marryat declined, wishing to remain anonymous. The book was a huge success, and laid the foundations for Halford's legacy as the "High Priest of the Dry Fly".

In 1889, when he was 45, Halford retired from the family business to pursue fly fishing and writing. In that year he published his second book, Dry Fly Fishing in Theory and Practice. Before he died, he fished a variety of beats on the Kennet, the Test and the Itchen but he rarely fished outside the country or away from the chalk streams of the south of England. It was on the Itchen where he met and fished with G. E. M. Skues in 1891. Halford published four other books on dry-fly fishing before his death: Making a Fishery (1895), Dry Fly Entomology (1897), Modern Development of the Dry Fly (1910) and The Dry Fly Man's Handbook (1913), as well as his autobiography An Angler's Autobiography (1903).

Halford was among the founding members of the British Flyfishers' Club, a prestigious gentlemen's' club in London devoted to the sport of fly fishing.

=== Halford vs Skues, dry fly vs nymph ===
Halford, along with Marryatt, perfected upstream dry-fly fishing in late 19th-century England and treated other forms of fly presentation, such as wet flies and nymphs on English chalk streams, with disdain. By the early 20th century, the Halford dry-fly doctrine had become cultish and to some extent dogmatic. The following passage by Halford epitomises his dogmatic views:

... Those of us who will not in any circumstances cast except over rising fish are sometimes called ultra purists and those who occasionally will try to tempt a fish in position but not actually rising are termed purists... and I would urge every dry fly fisher to follow the example of these purists and ultra purists.

— From A History of Flyfishing, Bark, 1992

When G. E. M. Skues began promoting upstream nymphing techniques on English chalk streams at the turn of the 20th century, there was immediate tension between those who favoured and followed the Halford school of dry-fly fishing and those who chose to use other techniques. There is no evidence that there was ever any personal animosity between the two anglers, only verbal wrangling in the sporting press about the pros and cons of the two techniques. Indeed, Skues's second work The Way of a Trout with the Fly, which codified the upstream nymphing technique, was not published until 1921, well after Halford's death.

The debates continued into the 1930s. The Halfordian school claimed that upstream nymphing, although effective, was unethical and bad for the chalk streams, even to the point of banning the use of nymph on some fisheries, while Skues's proponents claimed that the dogmatic dry-fly approach limited opportunities when nymphing was a more appropriate technique. A culmination of sorts took place in February 1938 at the Flyfishers' Club when the so-called "Nymph Debate" took place. Skues was present to defend nymphing techniques, while many others, chiefly Sir Joseph Ball, defended the Halfordian doctrine. The result was decidedly in favour of Halford's dry-fly techniques to the exclusion of all others, but no one denied the effectiveness of Skues's nymphing methodology. The debate helped cement both Halford's and Skues's seminal roles in the development of modern-day fly fishing.

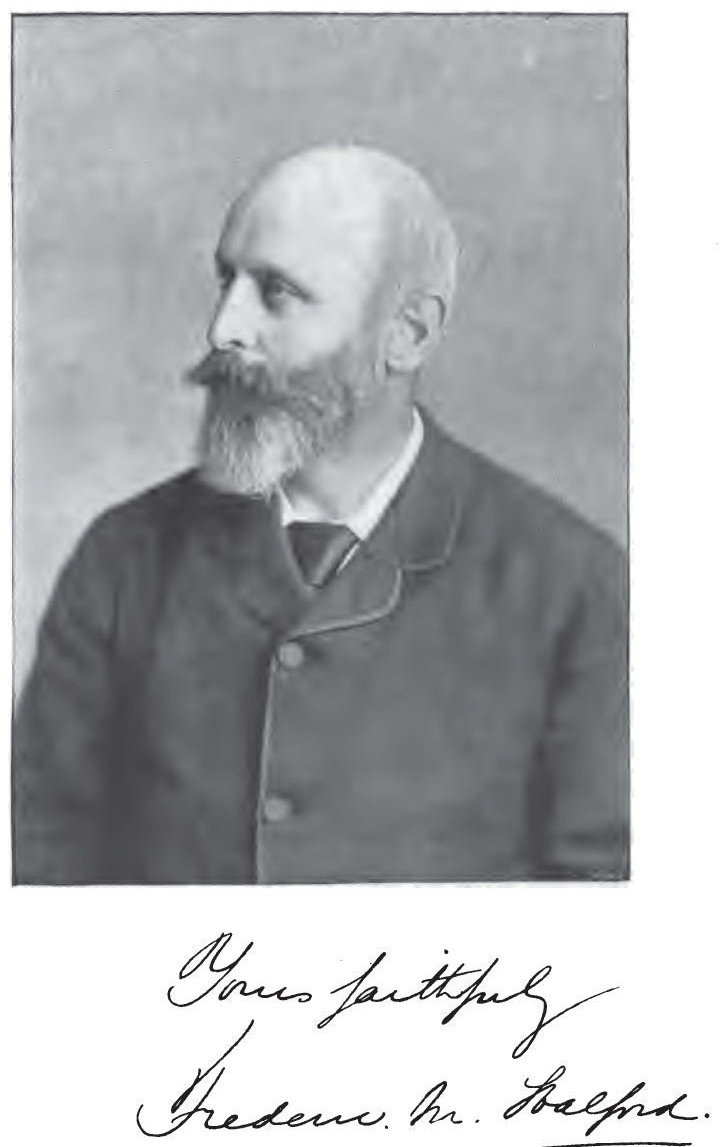
Halford from the frontispiece of his Making a Fishery, 1895

=== Influences on American angling ===
Charles Goodspeed, in Angling in America (1939), his history of American angling, credits Halford's Floating Flies and How to Dress Them as having a significant influence on the introduction of the dry-fly method into America. In 1890 Halford exchanged a series of letters on the subject of dry-fly fishing with American angler, Theodore Gordon, to include a complete set of Halford's favourite dry flies. In 1892, Favorite Flies and Their Histories, by Mary Orvis Mabury devoted a coloured plate to a selection of Halford's dry flies, along with their method of use.

== Death ==
Frederic Halford was wealthy enough to take winter vacations in Europe and the Mediterranean to escape the English winter weather. He was also an amateur photographer and liked to capture the people and places he visited during his winter trips abroad. Much of his work still survives today and shows that he visited Spain in 1908, Pontresina in 1909, Egypt in 1910 and Biskra in 1911. In February 1914 he was in Tunis. During the return voyage he fell ill with pneumonia on the P&O liner Morea. He died aboard on 5 March 1914 as the ship was arriving in London on the River Thames. He was 69 years old. After his funeral, praise for Halford in the mainstream British press as well as the sporting press was overwhelming. William Senior, editor of The Field, and a close personal friend of Halford wrote:

... He was a delightful companion-generous, big-hearted, amusing, a sayer of good things in a human way, and finely opinionated, which of course, was not a serious matter when he expected and liked you to be opinionated also. He was a dangerous man to tackle in an argument if your knowledge of the subject was rickety. He was emphatically what is termed a well-informed man, for that thoroughness of his stamped his knowledge and ruled his memory. You could not always agree with him, but could seldom floor him, the ground he stood upon being rock-solid. As both a giver and taker of chaff he was an adept. He had the courage of his opinions, and none wiser than he when it was best to keep his opinions an unknown quantity. In travelling or by the waterside he was wonderfully helpful if help was good for you-perhaps, if anything, too helpful, though I cannot conceive a more pardonable fault than that.

— William Senior, The Field, 1914

In the Journal of the Fly Fisher's Club, published shortly after Halford's death, Dr A. C. Kent wrote:

...By what is really a life's work, Halford has raised fly fishing for trout, both as a sport and as a scientific pursuit, to a higher level than it has ever before attained, and by so doing has made fly fishing a better and more absorbing recreation for us all.

— Dr. A. C. Kent, Journal of the Fly Fisher's Club, 1914

== Books by Frederic M. Halford ==
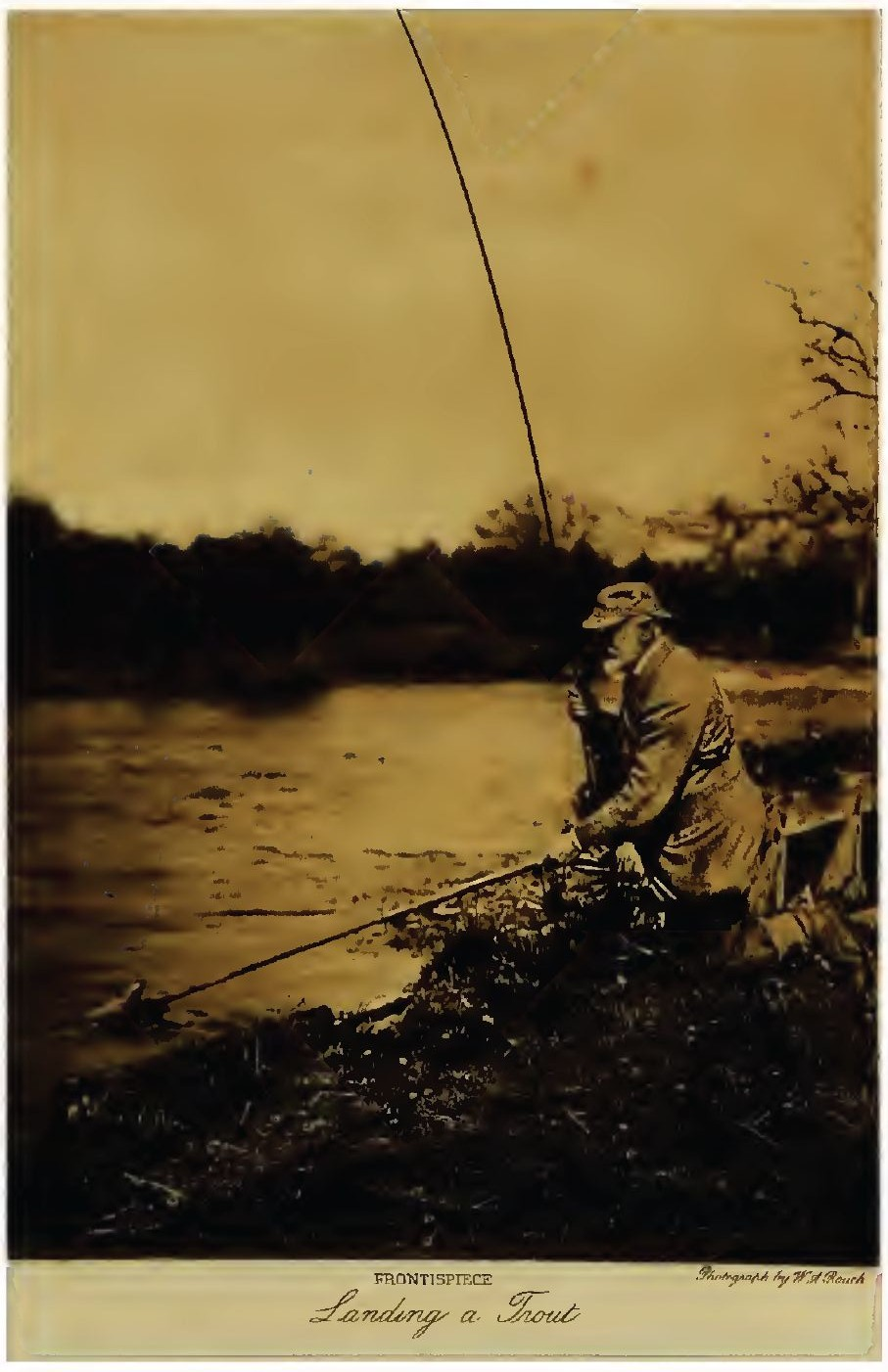
Landing a Trout from Dry Fly Man's Handbook

In 1894, The New York Times wrote of Halford:

... And now I come to books which are nothing if not practical. Of these, Mr. F. M. Halford's "Floating Flies and How to Dress Them," and his "Dry Fly Fishing in Theory and Practicet command the first place, as being, within certain limits, the best books on fishing with the artificial fly ever written.

- Halford, F. M. (1886). Floating Flies and How To Dress Them. A Treatise on the Most Modern Methods of Dressing Artificial Flies for Trout and Grayling with Full Illustrated Directions and Containing Ninety Hand-Coloured Engravings of the Most Killing Patterns Together with a Few Hints to Dry-Fly Fishermen (PDF). London: Sampson, Low, Marston, Searle, and Rivington.
- Halford, F. M. (1889). Dry Fly Fishing-In Theory and Practice. London: Ballantine Press. "Halford."
- Halford, Frederic M. (1895). Making a Fishery. London: Horace Cox.
- Halford, Frederic M. (1897). Dry Fly Entomology. London: Vinton & Co. p. 315. "Halford."
- Halford, F. M. (1903). An Angler's Autobiography. London: Vinton and Co.
- Halford, Frederic M. (1910). Modern Development of the Dry Fly: The New Dry Fly Patterns, the Manipulation of Dressing Them and Practical Experiences of Their Use (PDF). London: G. Routledge.
- Halford, Frederic M. (1913). The Dry-fly Man's Handbook: A Complete Manual, Including The Fisherman's Entomology and The Making and Management of a Fishery (PDF). London: G. Routledge Ltd.

== See also ==
- Bibliography of fly fishing
- Pseudonyms of notable angling authors
