= Dry fly fishing =

Angling technique

Dry fly fishing is an angling technique which uses an artificial fly lure which floats on the surface of the water and does not sink. It was developed originally for trout fly fishing.

== The fish and the dry fly ==
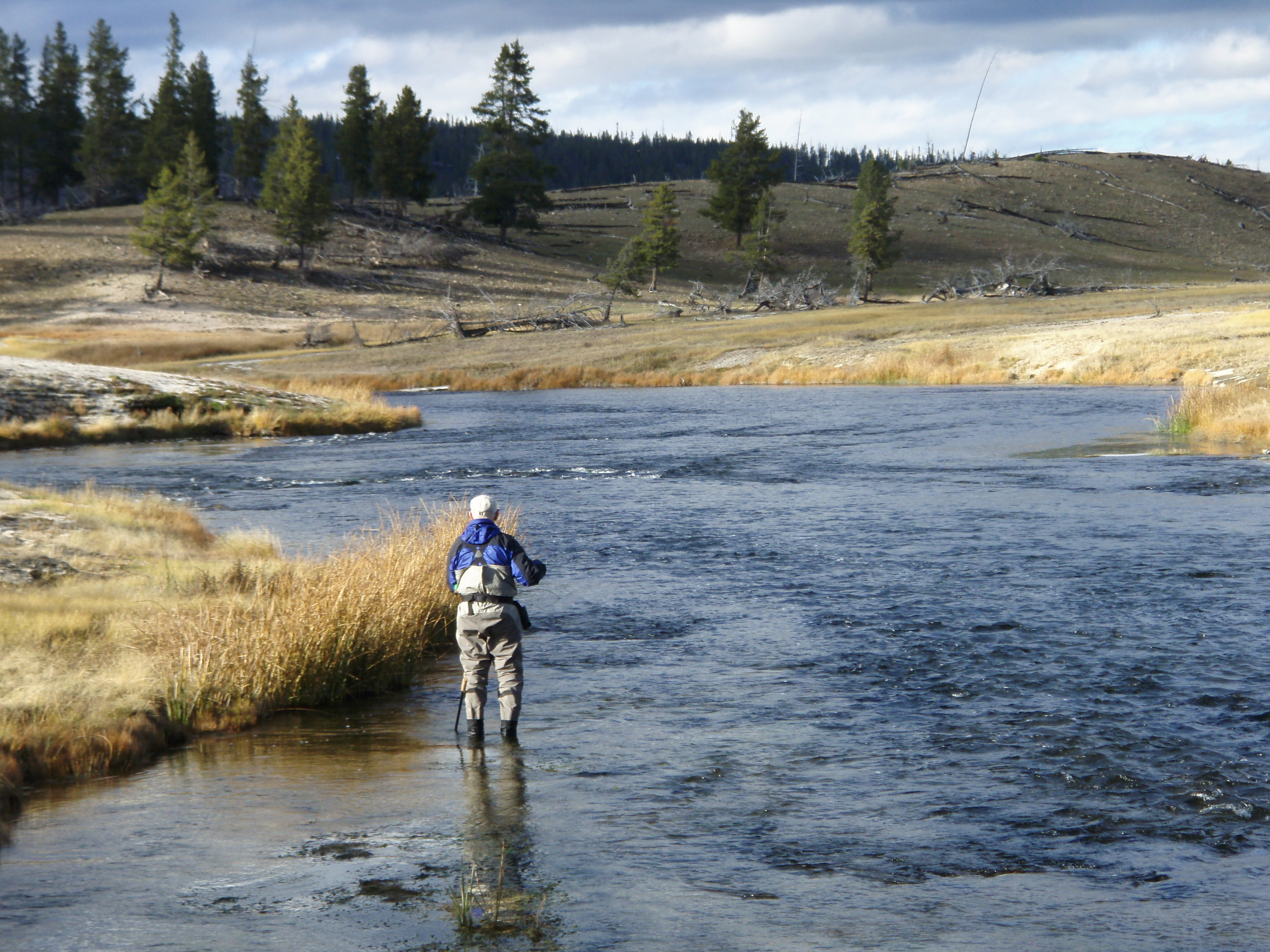
Fly angler on the Firehole River, USA

Fly fishing for trout can be done using various methods and types of flies. Trout mostly feed near the bed of the stream, where wet flies and especially nymphs are used. Trout may also come to the surface to feed, typically on winged insects following hatch events. Particularly during the summer months, trout also often feed on terrestrial insects such as ants, beetles and grasshoppers when they fall onto the water surface. However, midges hatch year-round, and so smaller dry flies may be used successfully outside of the summer, when trout may favor caddisflies or mayflies.

Salmon may also occasionally bite a dry fly lure in specific scenarios where other flies would not be as useful, such as when the fish is in shallow water during very sunny conditions.

== Angling technique ==
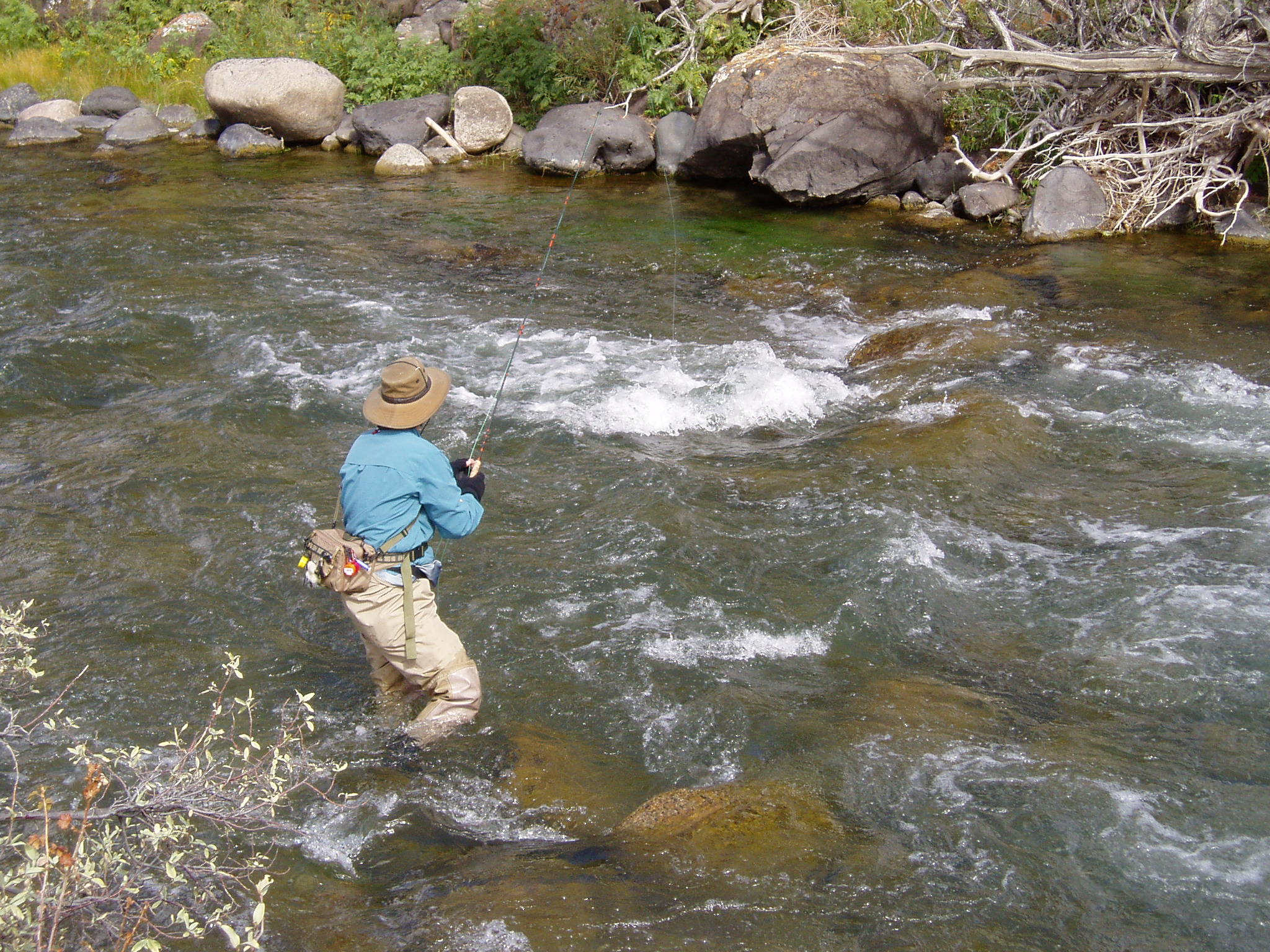
Fly fishing on the Gardner River in Yellowstone National Park, USA

The aim of dry-fly fishing is to mimic the downstream drifting of a real fly on the surface of the water, and is sometimes regarded as more difficult than other fishing techniques. Dry-fly fishing uses a line and flies that float. They are joined by a fine 3 to 5 meters long leader, typically of nylon monofilament line, which is tapered so that it is nearly invisible where the fly is knotted, and the angler can replace the last meter or so of nylon as required.

J.W. Dunne recommends that trout are used to their prey approaching them in the current, and such an optical phenomenon should be mimicked by a fly lure. Trout fishermen therefore prefer to begin downstream of the fish's suspected lie and work upstream into the current. Trout can see a wide area around them, so the angler must stay not only downstream of the fish, but also as low to the ground and as far from the bank as possible, moving upstream with stealth.

Trout tend to strike their food at current "edges", where faster- and slower-moving waters mix. Obstructions to the stream flow, such as large rocks or nearby pools, provide a "low energy" environment where fish sit and wait for food without expending much energy. Casting upstream to the edge of the slower water, the angler can see the fly land and drift slowly back downstream. The fly should land softly, as if dropped onto the water, with the leader carefully positioned to control the drift through the strike zone and present the fly to the intended target without making the fish aware of the angler's presence.

A notable challenge in stream fishing is accurately placing the fly lure (e.g., within inches of a protective rock) to mimic the behaviour of a real fly. When done properly, the fly appears to float in the current with a "perfect drift" as if not connected to a line. The angler must remain vigilant for the "take" in order to be ready to raise the rod tip and set the hook.

Due to rivers having faster and slower currents often running side by side, the fly can overtake or be overtaken by the line, thus disturbing the fly's drift. Mending is a technique whereby one lifts and moves the part of the line that requires re-aligning with the fly's drift, thus extending the drag free drift. The mend can be upstream or downstream depending on the currents carrying the line or fly. To be effective, any mending of the fly line should not disturb the natural drift of the fly. Learning to mend is often easier if the angler can see the fly.

Lastly, due to the social nature of fishing it is common for parties to impinge on perceived boundaries. Etiquette varies by locality, but stomping through streams, "slapping and stripping", and high-holing are generally frowned upon.

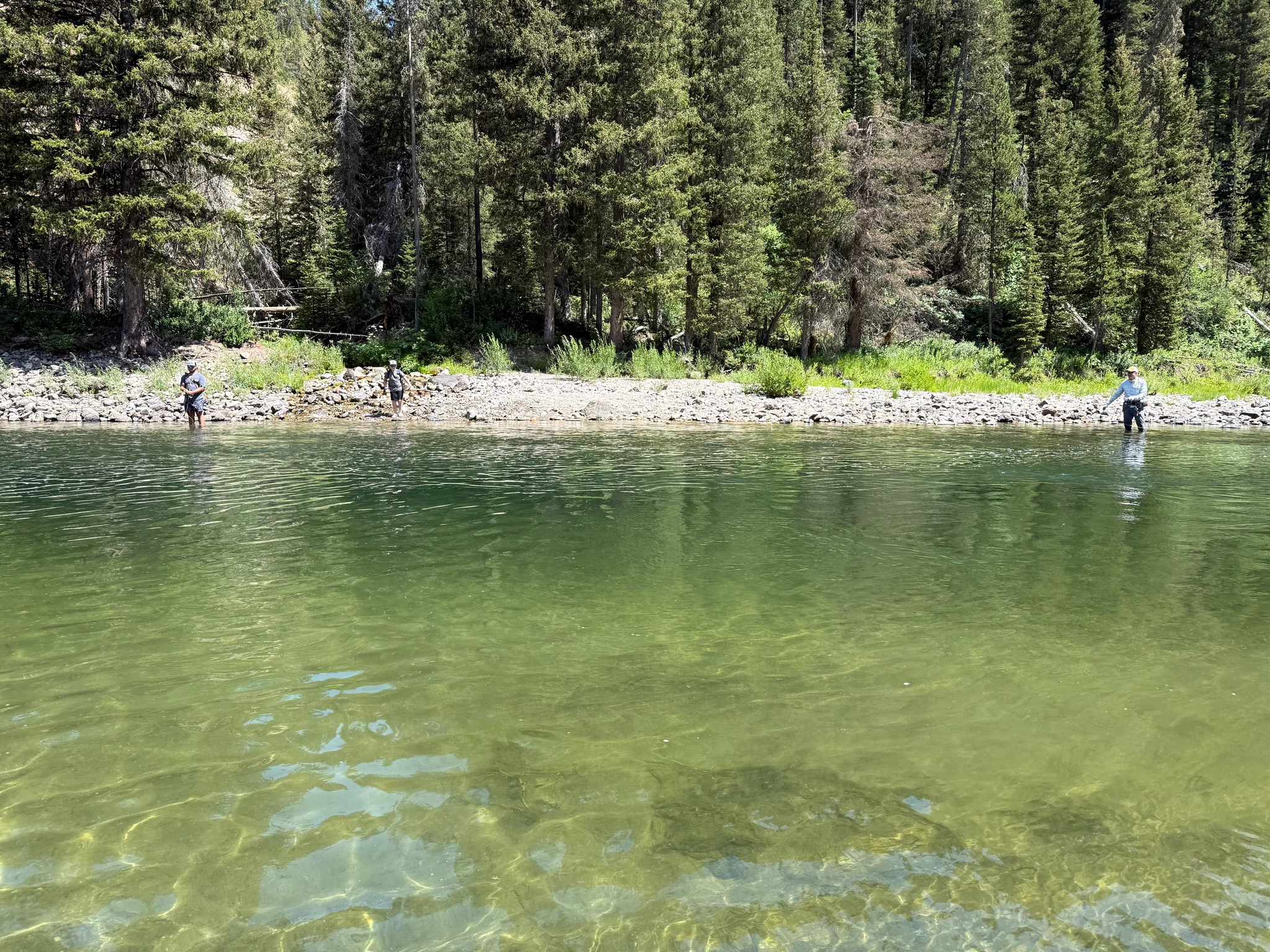
A veteran fisherman being high-holed by two younger fishermen

Compared to "wet" fly fishing, bites on dry fly lures are highly visible. Many anglers prefer dry fly fishing because of the relative ease of detecting a strike and the gratification of seeing a trout strike their fly. Nymph fishing is easier; it doesn't require "angling" skills associated with learning various casting techniques.

Once a fish has been caught and landed, the fly may be wet and no longer float well. Flies can sometimes be dried by "false" casting back and forth in the air. With care, a small piece of reusable absorbent towel, an amadou patch or a Chamois leather may be used. A used dry fly which refuses to float may be replaced with another similar or identical fly while the original dries out. After drying, a fly may need a fresh application of water-repellent fly "dressing" liquid.

== Dry flies ==
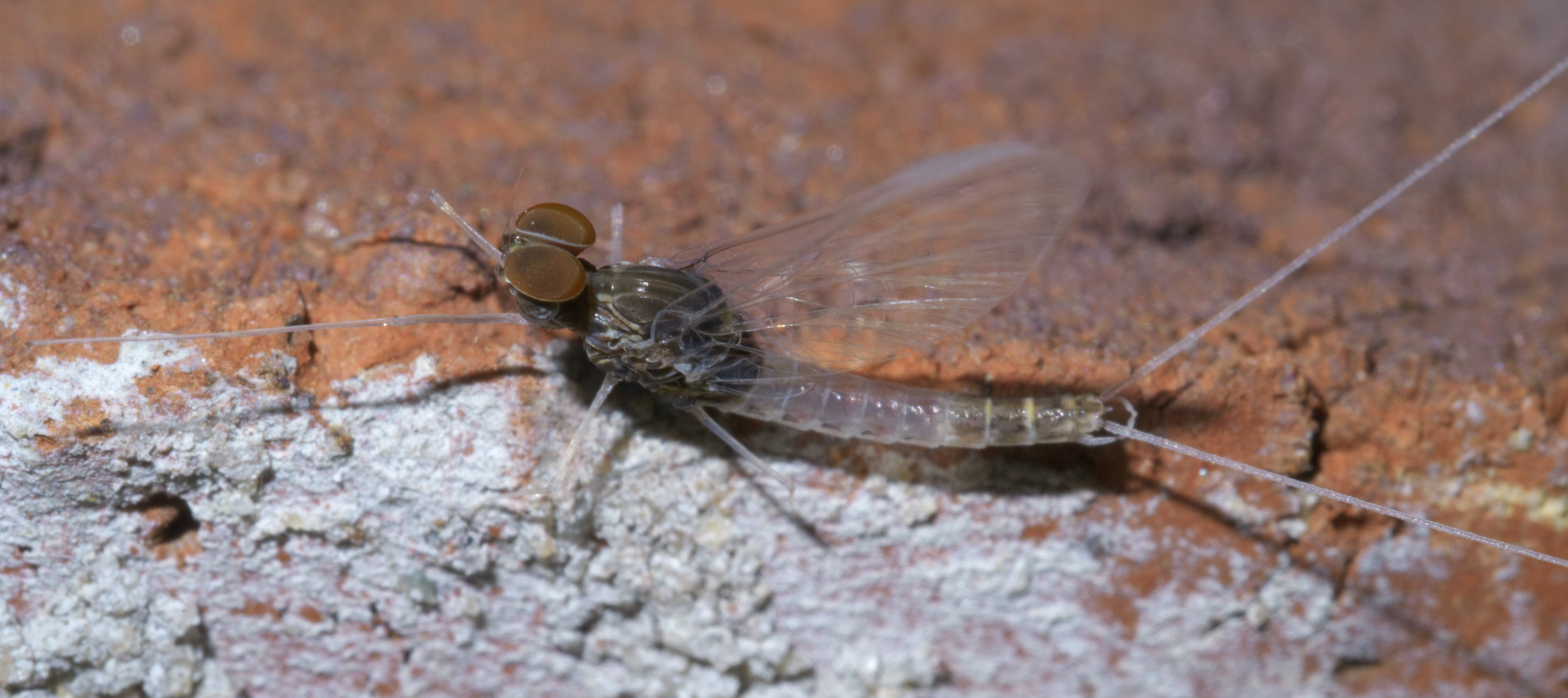
Baetis fly

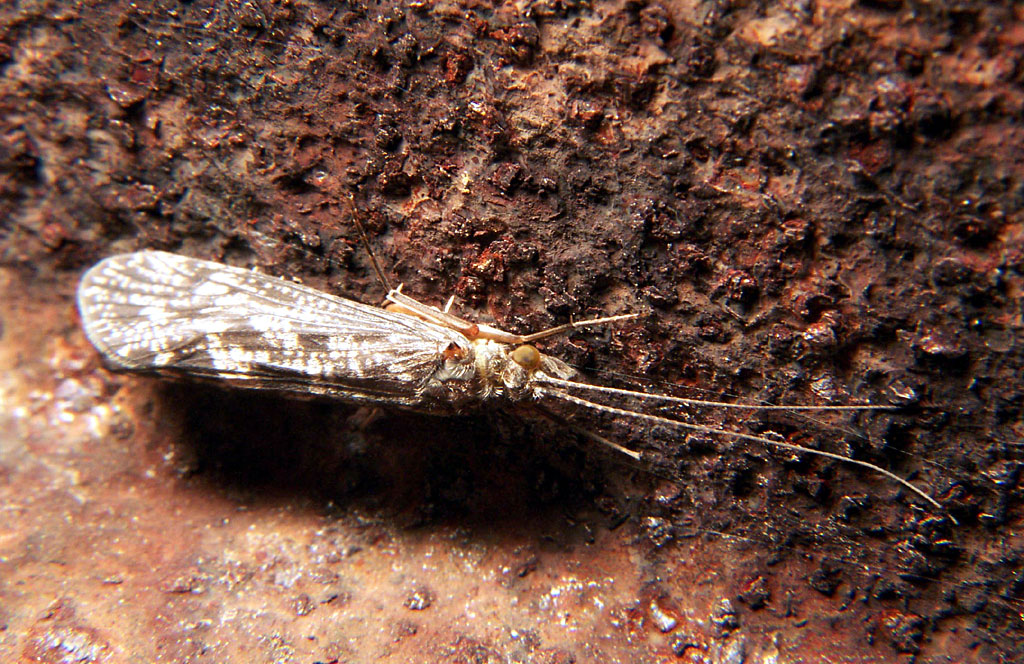
Caddisfly

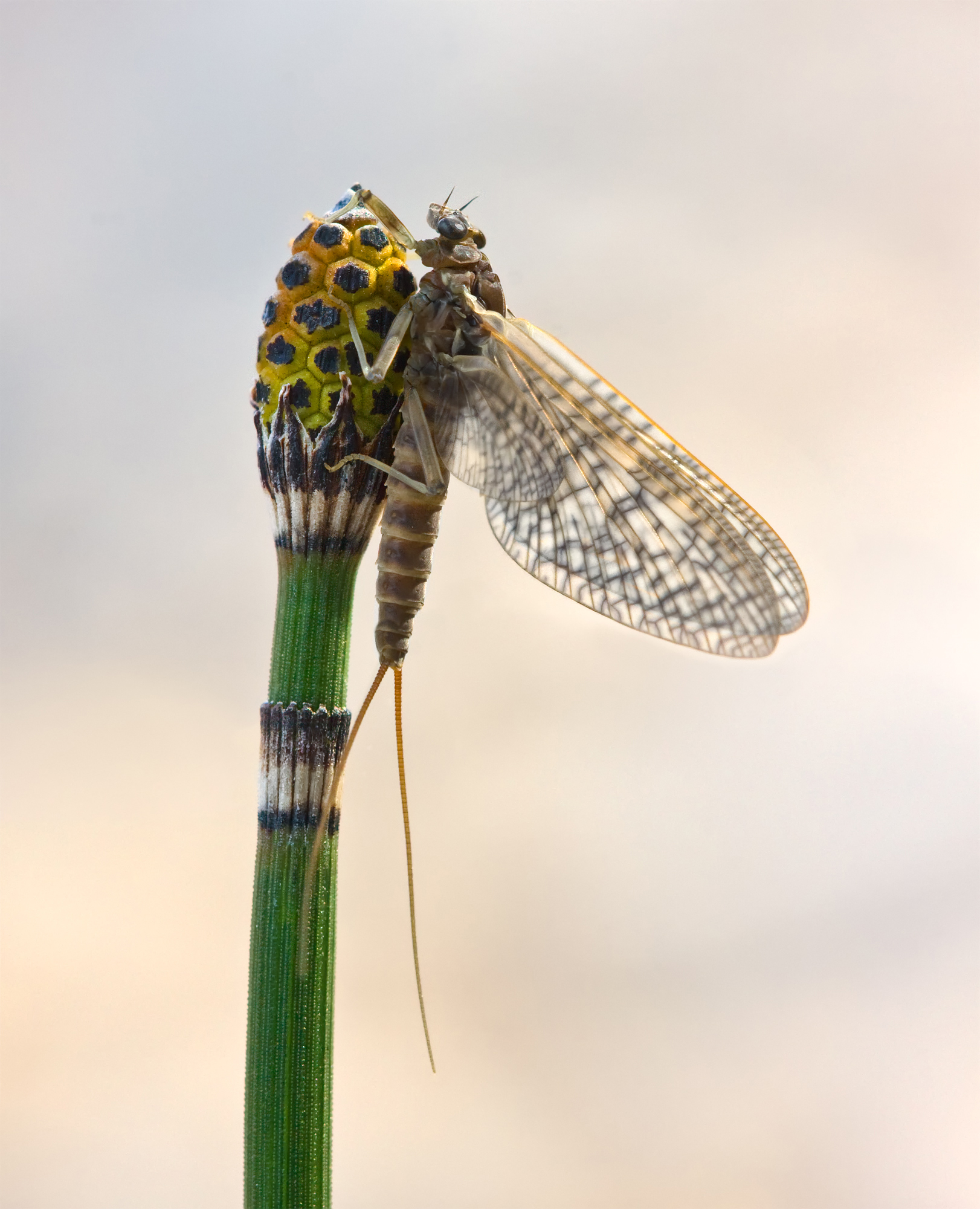
Trico Mayfly

A dry fly is designed to land softly on the surface of the water without breaking it and becoming wetted, but does not necessarily need to be buoyant. They are often oiled or treated with another water repellent. Dry flies are used in freshwater.

Dry fly lures can be separated into two broad categories: imitations and attractors. Imitations typically represent the adult form of an aquatic or terrestrial insect, such as the elk hair caddis, a caddisfly imitation. The small Baetis (blue-winged olive, BWO) is another common fly, for which several imitators have been designed. Attractor fly lures may not directly mimic an insect, but are easily seen used to provoke the attention of a target fish. Attractors are often best used in low clarity water.

A translucent fly seen from underneath with sunlight shining through it looks very different to a fly when out of the sun. Some dry flies, especially imitators, are especially designed to mimic this effect. J. W. Dunne developed a technique of painting the shaft of the hook white and wrapping it in translucent artificial silk, which he then oiled.

Salmon flies, such as the Parks' Salmonfly, are usually larger than trout flies.

Some dry flies
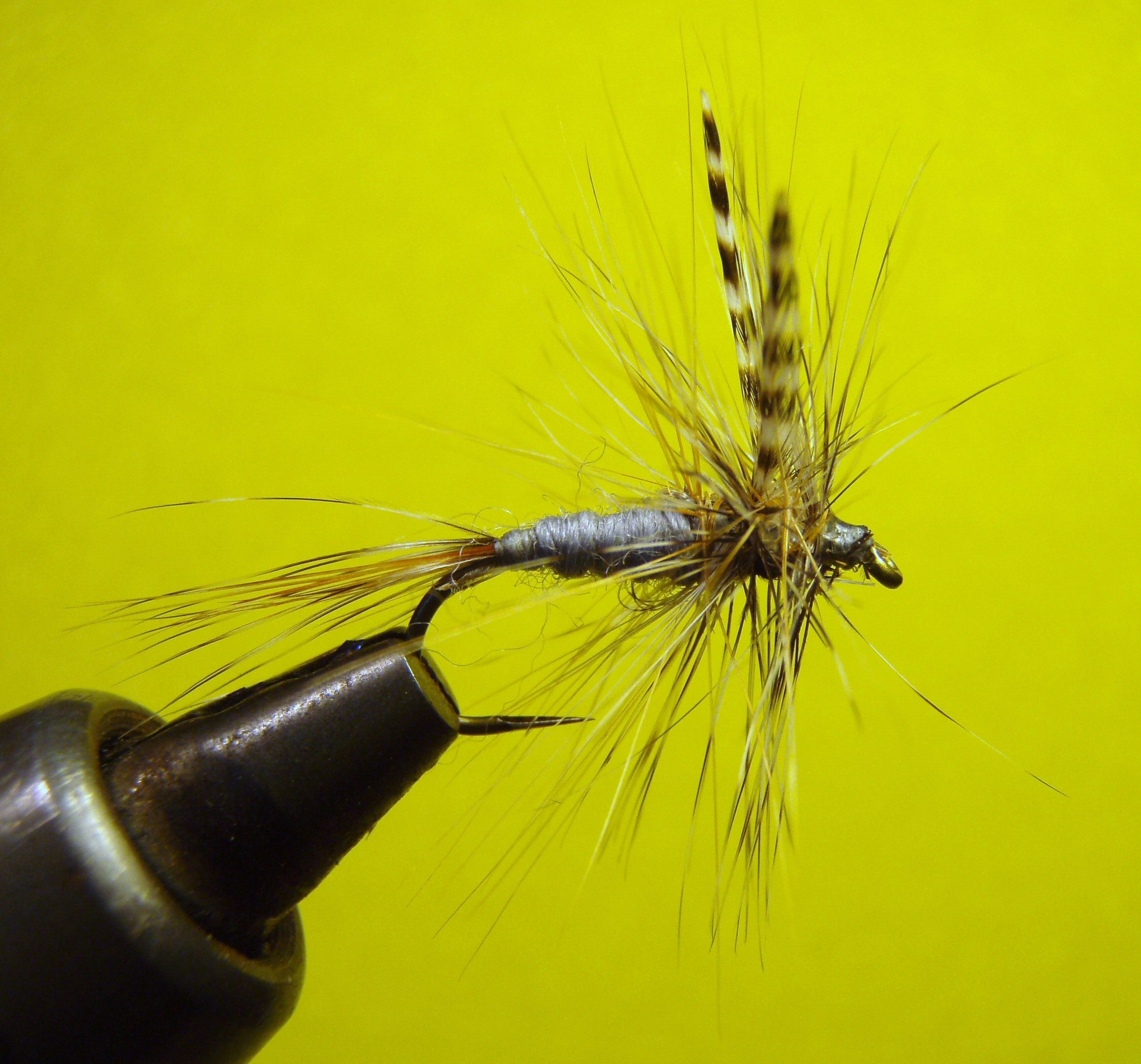
Adams, a very popular and widely used dry fly

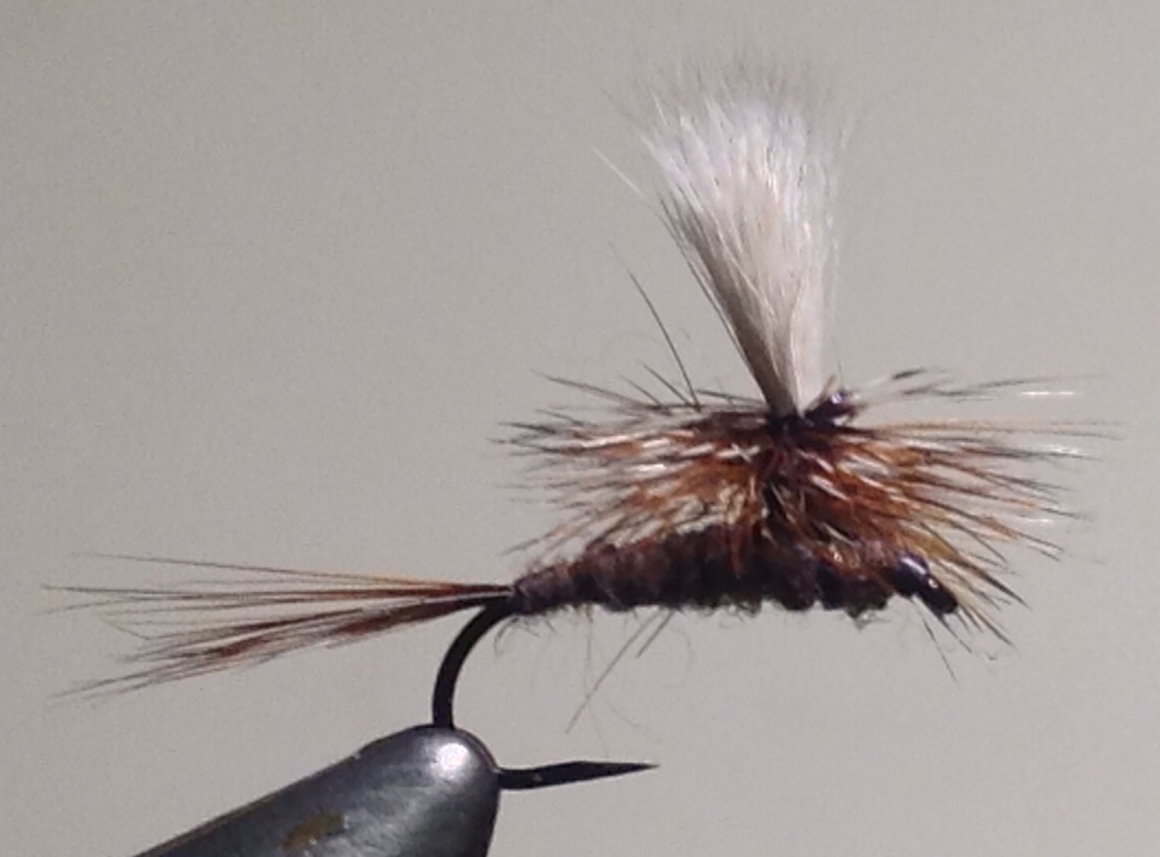
Parachute Adams

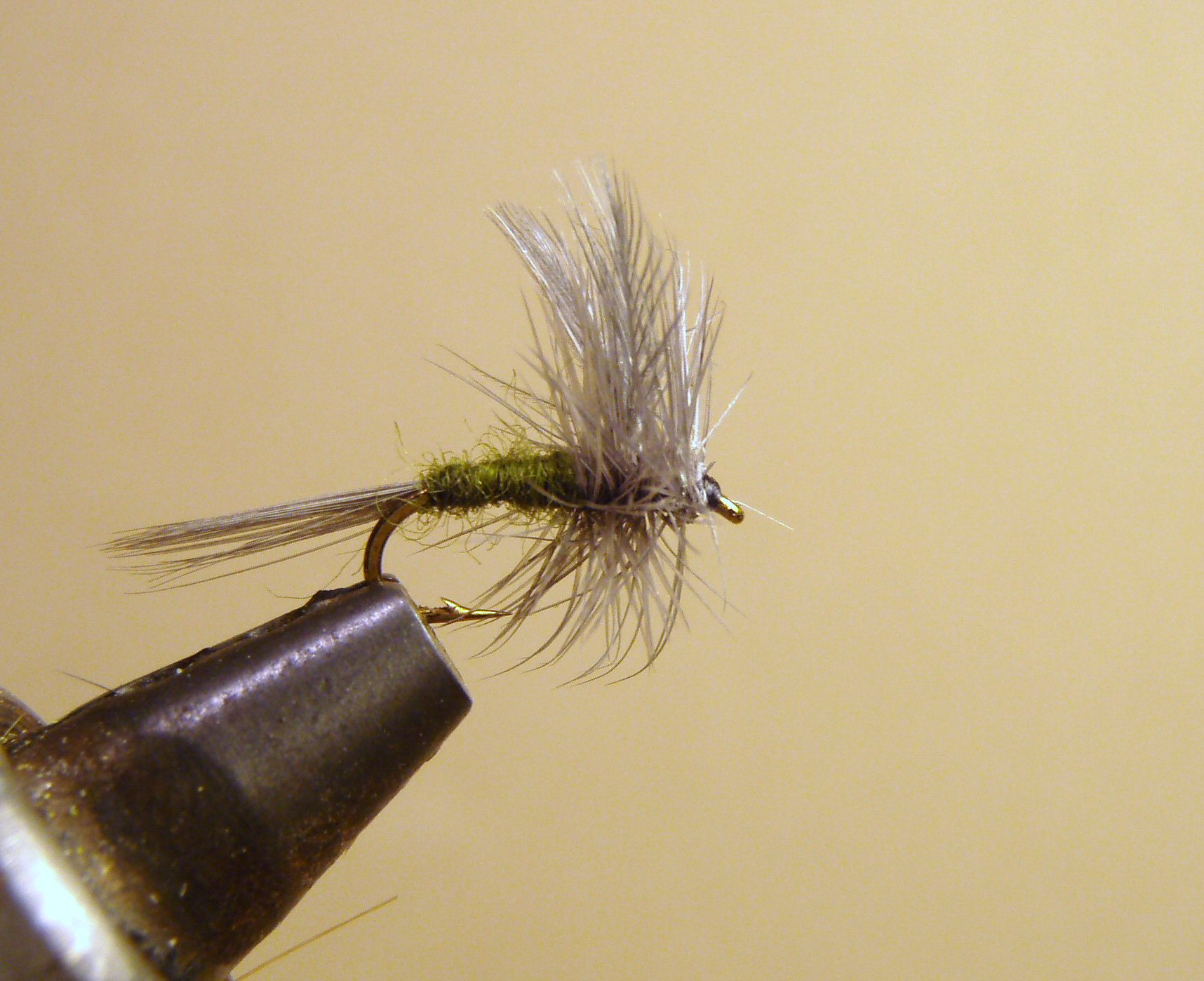
Green Drake, One of several imitations of the Blue-winged Olive

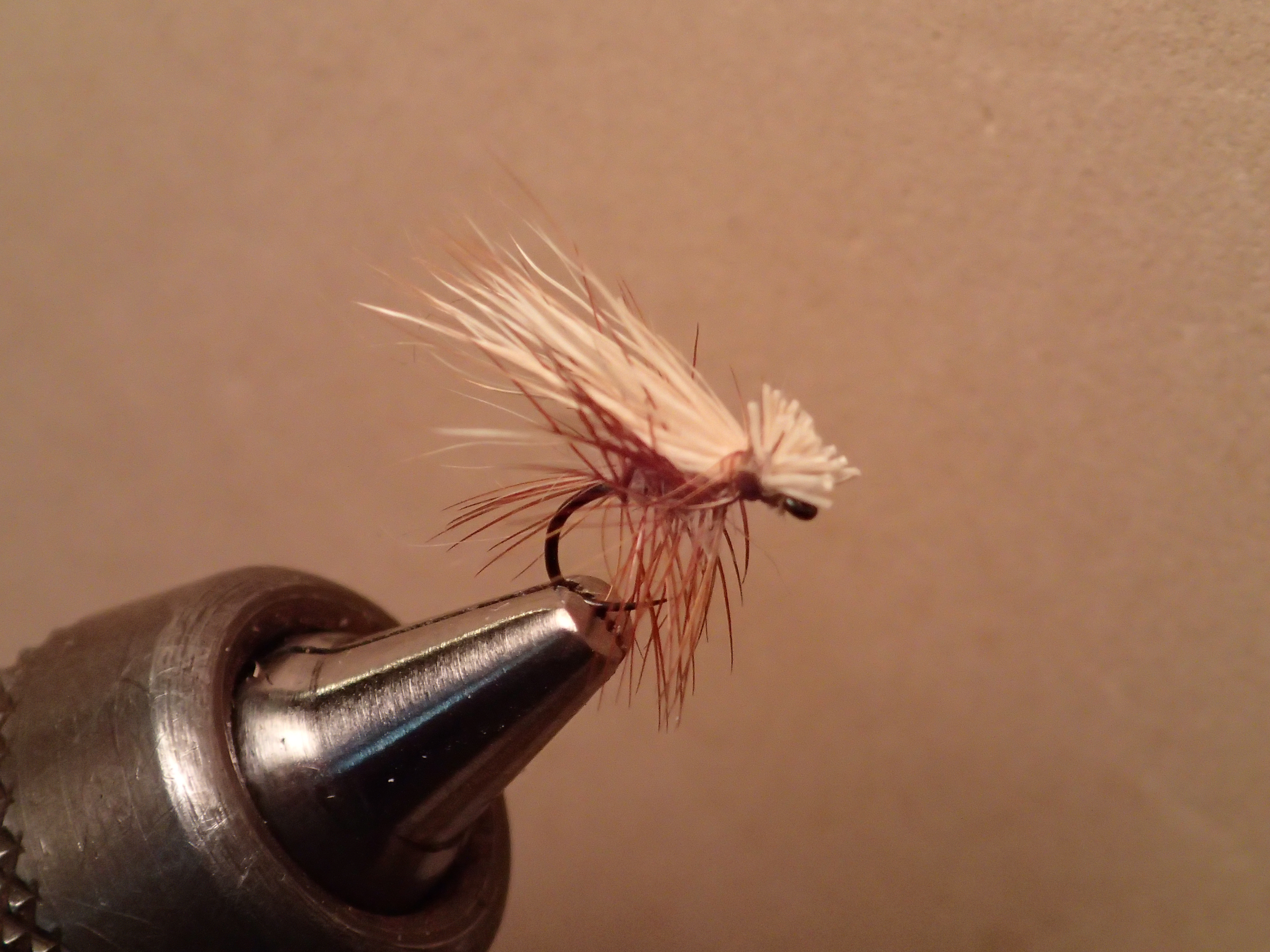
Elk Hair Caddis Caddisfly imitation

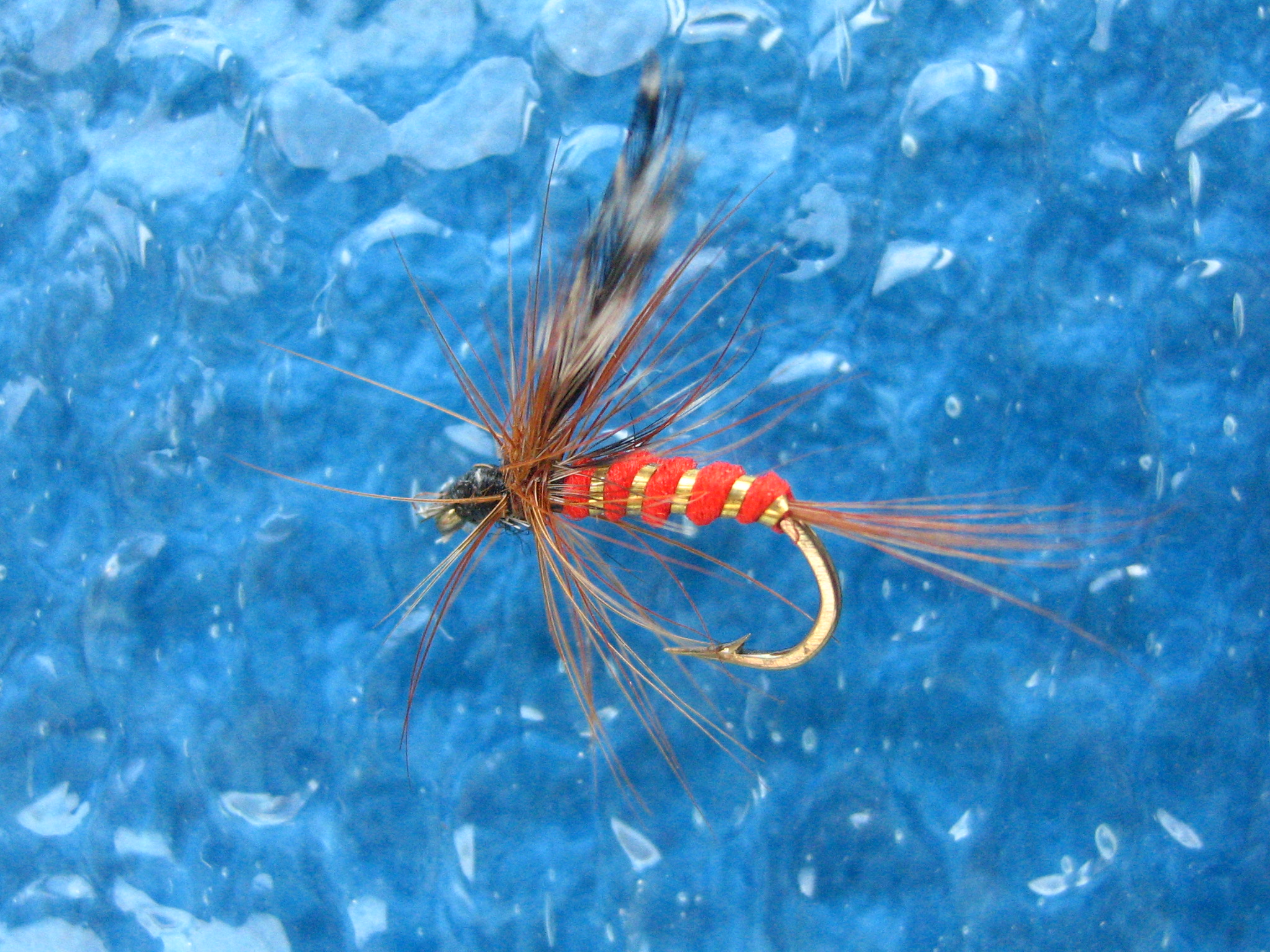
Red spinner, Trico Mayfly, aka Spinner, imitation

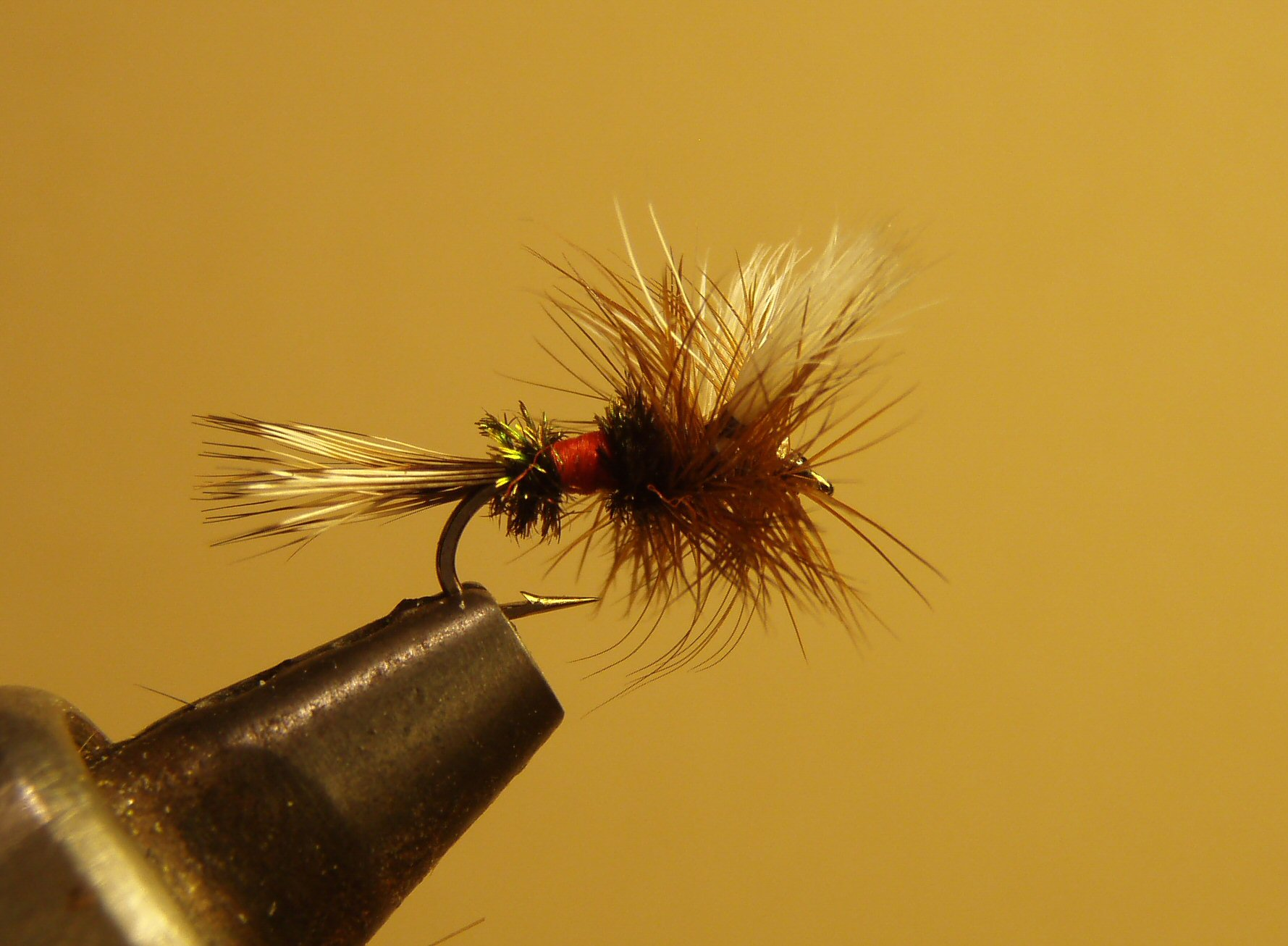
Royal Wulff, a common attractor pattern

The following is a list of the more popular dry flies for trout:

- Adams, including Parachute Adams, Spent or Cripple Adams, Klinkhammer Adams, Purple Haze
- Ant
- Asher (similar to the Griffith Gnat, imitates midge clusters)
- Blue Dun
- Blue-winged Olive, Parachute BWO, Klinkhammer BWO
- Callibaetis, including Cripple Callibaetis, Comparadun (Callibaetis imitation)
- Caddis, Elk Hair Caddis, CDC Caddis, X-Caddis (Caddisfly imitation, aka Sedge)
- Cahill, Light Cahill, Dark Cahill, Parachute Cahill (Stenonema imitation)
- Crane fly (Crane fly imitation), Daddy Long Legs
- Damselfly (Damselfly imitation)
- Drake, Brown, Yellow, Green
- Grasshopper, including foam, Chernobyl, and bullet head hoppers
- Griffith's Gnat (imitates Gnat, named after George Griffith one of the founders of Trout Unlimited)
- Hendrickson, Light and Dark Henrickson, Parachute Henrickson (Ephemerella subvaria Mayfly imitation)
- Humpy (resembles a host of Mayflies, none in particular)
- Isonychia, Isonychia Spinner (Isonychia imitation)
- March Brown (Rhithrogena germanica imitation)
- Minny Popper
- Mosquito
- Pale Morning Dun (Ephemerella excrucians imitation), Pale Evening Dun, Sparkle Dun, Sulphur Dun
- Quill, Gray Quill, Ginger Quill, Quill Gordon
- Spinner, Rusty Spinner, Trico, Hex Spinner
- Stimulator, Sedge
- Wolffs, Royal Wulff, attractor fly

== History ==
Dry fly fishing first became a serious sport in the 19th century, with the publication by Frederic M. Halford of two books: Floating Flies and How to Dress Them and Dry-Fly Fishing in Theory and Practice. Halford's artificial lures were designed to imitate real flies, but they only did so under limited conditions. This led J. W. Dunne to develop imitator lutes, based on his observations of the visual capabilities and behaviour of trout, which could be used more effectively in sunny weather. He published his findings in 1924 as Sunshine and the Dry Fly.

Meanwhile, G. E. M. Skues had begun promoting wet nymph fishing. He went on to popularise the use of attractors, designed to goad the fish into biting a flashy lure rather than fooling it into thinking the lure was its normal prey. Skues' approach was considered controversial by some, especially anglers who already favoured dry flies; in 1938 at a meeting of the Flyfishers' Club, the "Nymph Debate" between Skues and Joseph Ball took place, regarding the Skues' technique versus the more traditional Halfordian technique. However, Skues' approach proved more effective in the majority of situations.

Synthetic materials now play a significant part in the design of modern trout flies. Materials like poly yarn, which is less dense than water and therefore remains buoyant, and kapok, which can be dyed commercially using modern techniques, or other materials, including ice dubbing, have expanded the range of available fly-tying options. In addition, for stillwater competition chenille (fritz) materials are now used in many new flies, such as blobs.
