= Floating Flies and How to Dress Them =

1886 book by Frederic M. Halford

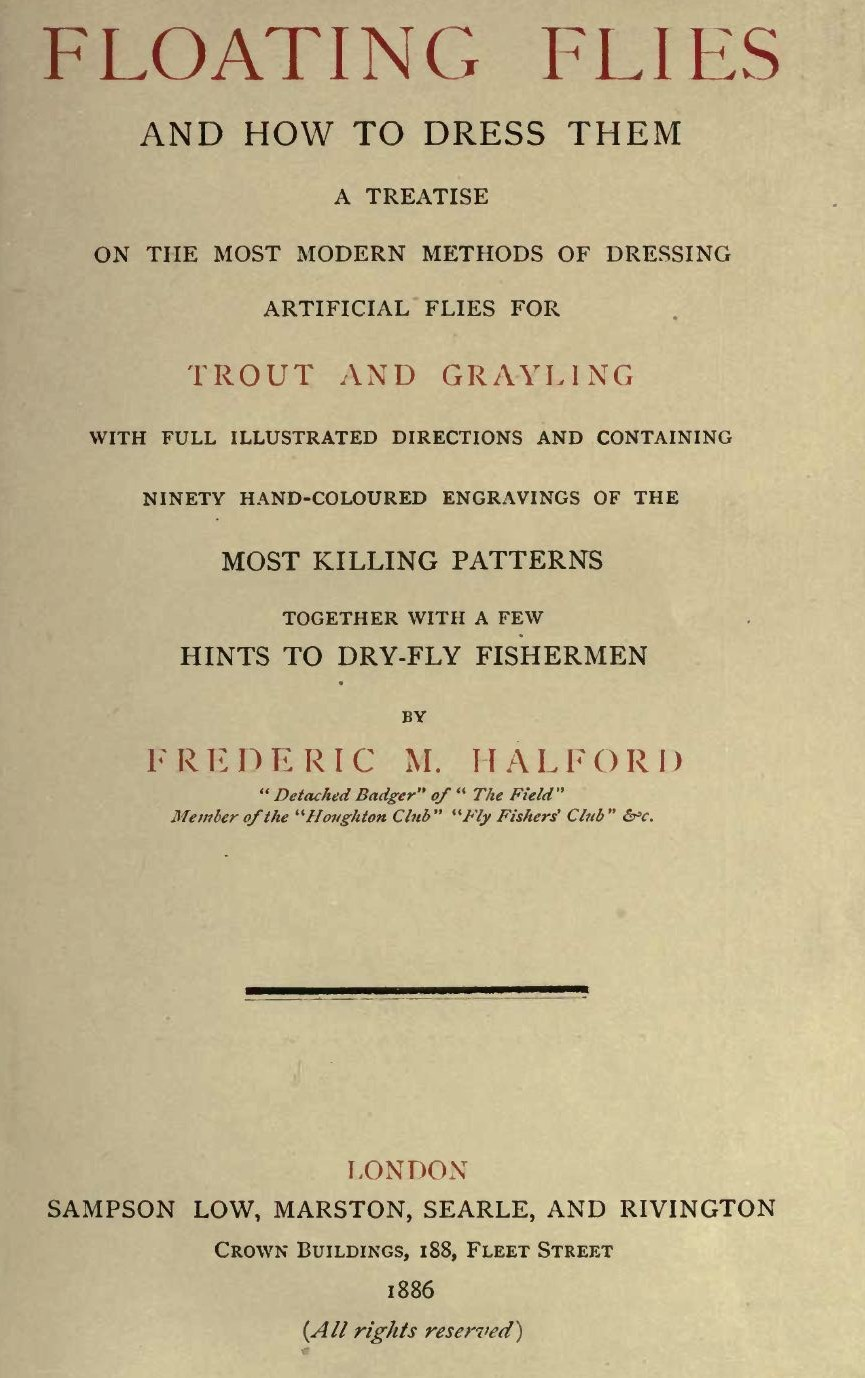
- Author: Frederic M. Halford
- Language: English
- Subject: Fly fishing
- Publisher: Sampson, Low, Marston, Searle, and Rivington; London
- Publication date: April 1886
- Publication place: England
- Pages: 136
- Followed by: Dry Fly Fishing in Theory and Practice (1889)

Floating Flies and How to Dress Them - A Treatise on the Most Modern Methods of Dressing Artificial Flies for Trout and Grayling with Full Illustrated Directions and Containing Ninety Hand-Coloured Engravings of the Most Killing Patterns Together with a Few Hints to Dry-Fly Fishermen is a fly fishing book written by Frederic M. Halford published in London in April 1886 by Sampson Low. A deluxe edition (100 copies) on large paper sold out before publication and the trade edition of 500 nearly so.

== Synopsis ==
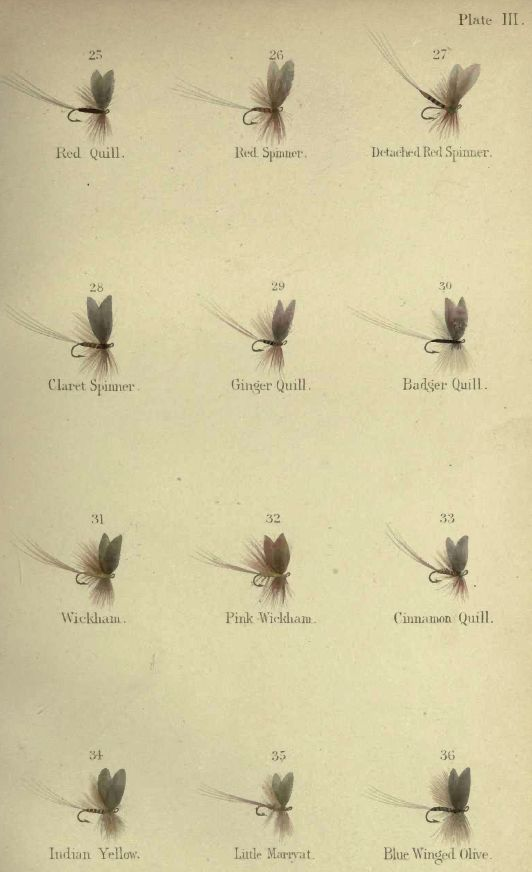
Plate III - Blue Duns and Hare's Ears

Floating Flies and How to Dress Them provides an in-depth study of nearly 100 duns and spinners in the English chalk streams of Hampshire County. The book contains detailed drawings and instructions on how to create hand-made artificial flies. Included is information on types of hooks and implements to use, plus tips on dyeing materials and how to dress the flies on eyed-hooks. The book contains ten colorplates and many black and white line drawings illustrating specific techniques.

== Reviews ==
- In 1894, the New York Times wrote of Floating Flies and How to Dress Them:

And now I come to books which are nothing if not practical. Of these, Mr. F. M. Halford's “Floating Flies and How to Dress Them,” and his “Dry Fly Fishing in Theory and Practice,” command the first place, as being, within certain limits, the best books on fishing with the artificial fly ever written. The limits are these. His books apply to the capture or brown trout and grayling only, salmon and sea trout being outside their purview.

- In 1913, Emlyn M.Gill. writing for the New York Times, said:

...when, in 1886, Mr. Halford published an important work on “Floating Flies and How to Dress Them.” he had practically a virgin field before him. His Dry-Fly Fishing in Theory and Practice,” published in 1889, became the standard work upon the subject.

- John Waller Hills, the noted British fly fishing historian of the early 20th century, said, "Halford is the historian of the dry fly," with his first book leading the way to the spread of dry-fly fishing across the globe.
- In his American Fly Fishing - A History (1987), Paul Schullery writes:

The dry-fly revolution that really got rolling with the appearance of Halford's first book, Floating Flies and How to Dress Them (1886) got plenty of attention in American books and articles.

- In The Fly (2001), fly fishing historian Andrew Herd discusses the influence Halford's book had on fly fishing outside England:

It is hard to state how great Halford's influence was. His name became almost synonymous with chalk stream fishing and his innovations did not go unnoticed abroad. It was Halford's work that inspired M. Albert Petit to write the book that re-introduced and popularized fly fishing in France. .... Halford was also an important influence on American fly-tying: by 1888 Floating Flies and How to Dress Them could be purchased for twelve dollars from Forest and Stream and his flies were available from William and Mills of New York in the same year.

- In F. M. Halford and the Dry-Fly Revolution (2002), Tony Hayter says of Floating Flies:

The response from the public to this impressive book was a first very favorable. Halford's scrapbook contains twenty-seven review notices, in which positive and gratifying adjectives abound: 'Practical, and at the same time delightfully-written', 'Thorough, clear and interesting', 'His almost unequalled experience', 'A real treat to get a book so plain and purposelike, and so beautifully got up in all respects'. The Field thought it 'something more than deeply interesting...a landmark.' The Globe wrote: 'The directions are beautifully clear, and anglers will be specially delighted with the illustrations.' Punch awarded the accolade in verse form: A capital volume, and no one will doubt it; No fisherman now should ever be without it.

- Paul Schullery writes in Halford on the Dry Fly (2008):

Halford's first book: Floating Flies and How to Dress Them (1886) was a concise and beautiful fly tying manual and fly pattern reference book, but contained only a brief chapter on how to actually fish with dry flies.

== Contents ==
- Chapter I - On Eyed-Hooks - 1
- Chapter II - On Materials and Implements For Fly Dressing. - 7
- Chapter III - On Dyeing - 22
- Chapter IV - To Dress Floating Flies on Eyed-Hooks - 31
- Chapter V - On Artificial Flies - 75
- Chapter VI - Hints To Dry-Fly Fishermen – 116
- List of Coloured Plates
  - Crawshaw and Co.'s Special Dyes - To Face Page 30
  - Plate I. Olive Duns - 84
  - Plate II - Blue Duns and Hare's Ears - 88
  - Plate III - Red Spinners, Wickham’s, Indian Yellow, Little Marryat, Blue Winged Olive, Etc. - 92
  - Plate IV - Hackle Duns and Spinners, Badgers, Etc. - 96
  - Plate V - Bumbles, Red Tags, Green Insect, Etc. - 100
  - Plate VI - Grannom, Alder, Ants, Fisherman's Curse, Black Gnats, Etc. - 104
  - Plate VII - Sedges, Etc. - 108
  - Plate VIII - Green Drakes - 112
  - Plate IX - Spent Gnats - 114

== Other editions ==
From Antiquarian Book Exchange

- Halford, F. M. (1886). Floating Flies and How To Dress Them. A Treatise on the Most Modern Methods of Dressing Artificial Flies for Trout and Grayling with Full Illustrated Directions and Containing Ninety Hand-Coloured Engravings of the Most Killing Patterns Together with a Few Hints to Dry-Fly Fishermen (2nd ed.). London: Sampson, Low, Marston, Searle, and Rivington.
- Halford, F. M. (1886). Floating Flies and How To Dress Them. A Treatise on the Most Modern Methods of Dressing Artificial Flies for Trout and Grayling with Full Illustrated Directions and Containing Ninety Hand-Coloured Engravings of the Most Killing Patterns Together with a Few Hints to Dry-Fly Fishermen (1st U.S. ed.). New York: Scribner and Welford.
- Halford, Frederic M. (1974). Floating Flies and How to Dress Them (1974 Reprint ed.). Winchester, UK: Barry Shurlock. ISBN 0-903330-08-3.
- Halford, Frederic M. (1993). Floating Flies and How to Dress Them (Flyfisher's Classic Library 1886 Facsimile ed.). Wales, UK: Bovey Tracy.
- Halford, Frederic M. (2008). Floating Flies and How to Dress Them (On-demand reprint ed.). Whitefish, MT: Kessinger Publishing, LLC. ISBN 978-1-4368-4909-8.

== See also ==
- Bibliography of fly fishing
