= Outline of fishing =

The following outline is provided as an overview of and topical guide to fishing:

Fishing – activity of trying to catch fish. Fish are normally caught in the wild. Techniques for catching fish include hand gathering, spearing, netting, angling and trapping.

== Essence of fishing ==
- Fishing – trying to catch fish.
- Fishing industry – any industry or activity concerned with taking, culturing, processing, preserving, storing, transporting, marketing or selling fish or fish products.
- Fishing techniques – methods for catching fish, or methods for catching other aquatic animals such as molluscs (shellfish, squid, octopus) and edible marine invertebrates.
- Fishing tackle – the equipment used by fishermen when fishing.
- Fishing vessel – a boat or ship used to catch fish in the sea, or on a lake or river.
- Fisherman or fisher – someone (male or female) who captures fish and other animals from a body of water, or gathers shellfish, including recreational fishermen. Fishing has existed as a means of obtaining food since the Mesolithic period. Worldwide, there are about 38 million commercial and subsistence fishermen and fish farmers.
- Recreational fishing or sport fishing – fishing for pleasure or competition.
- Environmental impact of fishing –

== Fishing tackle ==
=== Fish hooks ===
- Fish hook – a device for catching fish either by impaling them in the mouth or, more rarely, by snagging the body of the fish.
- Circle hook – a type of fish hook which is sharply curved back in a circular shape.
- Hookset – a motion made with a fishing rod in order to "set" a fish hook into the mouth of a fish once it has bitten a fishing lure or bait.
- Fishing gaff – a pole with a sharp hook on the end that is used to stab a large fish and then lift the fish into the boat or onto shore.
- Sniggle – a type of fish hook used for catching eels, using the method of sniggling.

=== Fishing line ===
- Fishing line – a cord used or made for angling.
- Monofilament – fishing line made from a single fiber of plastic.
- Multifilament or The Super Lines – a type of fishing line.
- Braided – one of the earliest types of fishing line and, in its modern incarnations, is still very popular in some situations because of its high knot strength, lack of stretch, and great overall power in relation to its diameter.
- Power pro – a type of fishing line made out of a material called Spectra fibers.
- Swivel – a small device consisting of two rings connected to a pivoting joint.

=== Fishing sinker ===
- Fishing sinker or knoch – a weight used in conjunction with a fishing lure or hook to increase its rate of sink, anchoring ability, and/or casting distance.
- Sandsinker – lead-free fishing sinkers made of fabric and filled with sand.
- Downrigger – Aa device used while fishing using the trolling method, which places a lure at the desired depth.
- Bombarda – a type of weighted float used in rod and reel fishing.
- Arlesey Bomb – an angling weight developed by Richard Walker at the lake in Arlesey.

=== Fishing rod ===
- Fishing rod or fishing pole – a tool used to catch fish, usually in conjunction with the pastime of angling, and can also be used in competition casting.
- Fishing reel – a device attached to a fishing rode used to wind the line up.
- Bamboo fly rod, split cane rod, or cane – a fly fishing rod that is made from bamboo.
- Fly rod building – constructing a fly fishing rod to match the performance desires of the individual angler.
- Fishing rod tapers – how much a fishing rod bends or flexes under pressure.

=== Fishing bait ===
- Fishing bait – any substance used to attract and catch fish.
- Bait fish – fish caught for use as bait to attract large predatory fish, particularly game fish.
- Groundbait – used in coarse fishing in order to attract fish to the fishing area.
- Chum – luring animals, usually fish or sharks, by throwing "chum" into the water.
- Clonk – a fishing tool used for catfish fishing, mainly in Europe.
- Worm compost – the product or process of composting utilizing various species of worms, usually red wigglers, white worms, and earthworms to create a heterogeneous mixture of decomposing vegetable or food waste, bedding materials, and vermicast.
- Worm charming, worm grunting, or worm fiddling – attracting earthworms from the ground.
- Boilies

==== Soft plastic bait ====
- Plastic bait – Soft plastic bait, commonly known as just plastic bait, is any of a range of plastic-based fishing baits, termed so because of their soft, flexible rubber texture.
- Soft plastic bait – Soft plastic bait, commonly known as just plastic bait, is any of a range of plastic-based fishing baits, termed so because of their soft, flexible rubber texture.
- Plastic worm – A plastic worm is a plastic fishing lure, generally made to simulate an earthworm.
- Deadsticking – While fishing, generally for black bass, deadsticking is the act of presenting a soft plastic lure either by casting or a vertical drop and allowing the bait to remain motionless for an extended period time before retrieval.
- Texas rig – The Texas rig is a technique used for fishing with soft plastic lures.
- Carolina rig – The Carolina rig is a plastic bait rig similar to the Texas rig, but with the weight fixed above the hook, instead of sliding down to it.

==== Fishing lures ====
Fishing lure – type of artificial fishing bait which is designed to attract a fish's attention. The lure uses movement, vibration, flash and color to bait fish.

- Artificial fly – An artificial fly or fly lure is a type of fishing lure, usually used in the sport of fly fishing.
- Fishing plug – Plugs are a popular type of hard-bodied fishing lure.
- Swimbait – Swimbaits are a loosely defined class of fishing lures that imitate fish and tend to be distinct in design from a typical crankbait.
- Hair rig – The hair rig is piece of fishing tackle which allows a bait to be presented without sitting directly on the hook.
- Little Cleo – The Little Cleo is a small spoon lure made by the Acme Tackle Company which comes in nine sizes from 1/16 oz (2 g) to 1 1/4 oz (35 g), and in many different color combinations.
- Mormyshka – Mormyshka is a sort of fishing lure or a jig.
- Original floater – The Original Floater is a wobbler type of fishing lure, manufactured by Rapala.
- Spinnerbait – A Spinnerbait refers to any one of a family of fishing lures that get their name from one or more metal blades shaped so as to spin like a propeller when the lure is in motion, creating varying degrees of flash and vibration that mimics small fish or other prey.
- Spin fishing – Spin fishing is an angling technique where a spinning lure is used to entice the fish to bite.
- Sabiki – A sabiki rig, sometimes called a piscatore rig, is a set of small lures typically used to catch fish that eat small prey.
- Jig fishing – Jigging is the practice of fishing with a jig, a type of fishing lure.
- Spoon lure – A spoon lure, in sport fishing, is an oblong, concave lure, usually of metal or shell, shaped like the bowl of a spoon.
- Spoonplug – A spoonplug is a form of fishing lure.
- Surface lure – A surface lure is a fishing lure designed to waddle, pop, lock, drop, pulse, twitch or fizz across the surface of the water as it is retrieved, and in doing so imitate surface prey for fish such as mice, lizards, frogs, cicadas, moths and small injured fish.
- Topwater lure – A Topwater fishing lure is a type of fishing lure, usually floating, that may be moved about the surface of water in order to attract and cause fish to attempt to strike the lure.
- Heddon – Heddon is a brand of artificial fishing lures created by James Heddon, who is credited with the invention of the first artificial fishing lures made of wood in the late 1890s.
- Zara Spook – Zara Spook 9260 is a topwater type fishing lure.

=== Bite indicators ===
Bite indicators –

- Fishing float – A float, also called a bobber, is a device used in angling that serves two main purposes: it can suspend the bait at a predetermined depth, and it can serve as a bite indicator.
- Shortfloating – Shortfloating is an angling method developed to increase the chances of catching a willing fish while decreasing the loss of terminal gear.
- Pellet waggler – A pellet waggler is a small, dumpy, float used for fishing.
- Quiver tip – A quiver tip is the top section, or tip, of the fishing rod which is designed to move, or quiver, when a fish bites.

=== Apparel etc. ===
- Hip boot – Hip boots, or waders as they are colloquially called, are a type of boot initially designed to be worn by river fishermen.
- Waders – Waders refers to a waterproof boot extending from the foot to the chest, traditionally made from vulcanised rubber, but available in more modern PVC, neoprene and Gore-Tex variants.
- Diving mask – A diving mask is an item of diving equipment that allows scuba divers, free-divers, and snorkelers to see clearly underwater.
- Creel – Creel is a type of small wicker basket mainly used by anglers to hold fish or other prey.
- Personal flotation device – A personal flotation device is a device designed to assist a wearer, either conscious or unconscious, to keep afloat.
- Wetsuit – A wetsuit is a garment, usually made of foamed neoprene, which is worn by surfers, divers, windsurfers, canoeists, and others engaged in water sports, providing thermal insulation, abrasion resistance and buoyancy.

== Fishing techniques ==
- Gathering seafood by hand – Gathering seafood by hand can be as easy as picking shellfish or kelp up off the beach, or doing some digging for clams or crabs, or perhaps diving under the water for abalone or lobsters.
- Angling – Angling is a method of fishing by means of an "angle".
- Handline fishing
- Fishing net – A fishing net or fishnet is a net used for fishing.
- Fish trap – A fish trap is a trap used for fishing.
- spears – Spearfishing is an ancient method of fishing that has been used throughout the world for millennia.
- Trawling – Trawling is a method of fishing that involves pulling a fishing net through the water behind one or more boats.
- Other – A fishfinder is an instrument used to locate fish underwater by detecting reflected pulses of sound energy, as in SONAR.

=== Gathering ===
- Gathering seafood by hand – Gathering seafood by hand can be as easy as picking shellfish or kelp up off the beach, or doing some digging for clams or crabs, or perhaps diving under the water for abalone or lobsters.
- Clam digging – Clam digging is a common means of harvesting clams from below the surface of the tidal mud flats where they live.
- Pearl diving – Pearl hunting or pearl diving refers to an obsolete method of retrieving pearls from pearl oysters, freshwater pearl mussels and, on rare occasions, other nacre-producing molluscs, such as abalone.
- Ama divers – Japanese divers, famous for collecting pearls.
- Scallops – Scallop aquaculture is the commercial activity of cultivating scallops until they reach a marketable size and can be sold as a consumer product.
- Noodling – Noodling is fishing for catfish using only bare hands, practiced primarily in the southern United States.
- Trout tickling – Trout tickling is the art of rubbing the underbelly of a trout using fingers. If done properly, the trout will go into a trance-like state after a minute or so, and can then easily be thrown onto the nearest bit of dry land.
- Flounder tramping – Flounder tramping is a traditional method of catching flounder or other flat fish by wading in shallow water and standing on them.

=== Spears ===
- Spearfishing – Spearfishing is an ancient method of fishing that has been used throughout the world for millennia.
- Speargun – A speargun is an underwater fishing implement designed to fire a spear at fish.
- Polespear – A polespear is an underwater tool used in spearfishing, consisting of a pole, a spear tip, and a rubber loop.
- Bowfishing – Bowfishing is a method of fishing that uses specialized archery equipment to shoot and retrieve fish.
- Harpoon – A harpoon is a long spear-like instrument used in fishing to catch fish or large marine mammals such as whales.
- Gigging – Gigging is the practice of hunting fish or small game with a gig or similar multi-pronged spear.
- Trident – A trident, also called a trishula or leister or gig, is a three-pronged spear.
- Hawaiian sling – The Hawaiian sling is a device used in spearfishing.

=== Lines ===
- Handline fishing – Handline fishing, or handlining, is fishing with a single fishing line which is held in the hands.
- Longline fishing – Longline fishing is a commercial fishing technique.
- Trolling – method of fishing where one or more fishing lines, baited with lures or bait fish, are drawn through the water.
- Dropline – A dropline is a commercial fishing device, consisting of a long fishing line set vertically down into the water, with a series of fishing hooks attached to snoods.
- Trotline – A trotline is a heavy fishing line with baited hooks attached at intervals by means of branch lines called snoods.
- Jigging – Jigging is the practice of fishing with a jig, a type of fishing lure.
- Jiggerpole – A jiggerpole is a very long fishing pole that is used with a very short and very heavy line, usually a foot or less of 50 lbf test or heavier.

=== Nets ===
- Fishing net – A fishing net or fishnet is a net used for fishing.
- Cast net – A cast net, also called a throw net, is a net used for fishing.
- Chinese fishing net – The Chinese fishing nets are fishing nets that are fixed land installations for an unusual form of fishing — shore operated lift nets.
- Drift net – Drift netting is a fishing technique where nets, called drift nets, are allowed to float freely at the surface of a sea or lake.
- Ghost nets –
- Gill net – Gillnetting is a common fishing method used by commercial and artisanal fishermen of all the oceans and in some freshwater and estuary areas.
- Glass floats
- Hand net – A hand net, also called a scoop net, is a net or mesh basket held open by a hoop.
- Lampara net – Lampara nets are surround nets with the shape of a spoon or dust pan.
- Lampuki net – Lampuki is the Maltese name for the dorado or mahi-mahi, a kind of fish that migrates past the Maltese islands during the autumn.
- Lave net – A lave net is a type of fishing net used in river estuaries, particularly in the Severn Estuary in Wales and England to catch salmon.
- Surrounding net – A surrounding net is a fishing net which surrounds fish on the sides and underneath.
- Seine net – Seine fishing is a method of fishing that employs a seine or dragnet.
- Tangle net –
- Trawl net – Trawling is a method of fishing that involves pulling a fishing net through the water behind one or more boats.
- Turtle excluder device – A turtle excluder device or TED is a specialized device that allows a captured sea turtle to escape when caught in a fisherman's net.

=== Traps ===
- Fishing traps – A fish trap is a trap used for fishing.
- Fish wheel – A fish wheel is a device for catching fish which operates much as a water-powered mill wheel.
- Fishing weir – A fishing weir, or fish weir, is an obstruction placed in tidal waters or wholly or partially across a river, which is designed to hinder the passage of fish.
- Fishing basket – A fishing basket is a basket used for fishing.
- Crab trap – Crab traps are used to bait, lure, and catch crabs for commercial or recreational use.
- Eel buck – Eel bucks are a type of fish trap that was prevalent in the River Thames in England up to the 20th century.
- Lobster trap – A lobster trap or lobster pot is a portable trap that traps lobsters or crayfish and is used in lobster fishing.
- Putcher fishing – Putcher fishing is a type of fishing which employs a large number of putcher baskets, set in a fixed wooden frame, against the tide in a river estuary, notably on the River Severn, in England and South East Wales.
- Corf
- Trabucco
- Almadraba – Almadraba tuna is tuna caught by an elaborate and age-old Andalusian technique of setting nets in a maze that leads to a central pool called "copo".
- Double-Heart of Stacked Stones – The Double-heart of stacked stones or the Twin-Heart Fish Trap is a stone weir located on the north side of Cimei, an island in the Penghu archipelago to the west of Taiwan.

=== Other ===
- Fishfinder – A fishfinder is an instrument used to locate fish underwater by detecting reflected pulses of sound energy, as in SONAR.
- Fishing light attractor – A fishing light attractor is a fishing aid which uses lights attached to structure above water or suspended underwater to attract both fish and members of their food chain to specific areas in order to harvest them.
- Fish aggregating device – A fish aggregating device is a man-made object used to attract ocean-going pelagic fish such as marlin, tuna and mahi-mahi.
- Payaos – A payaos is a type of fish aggregating device used in Southeast Asia, particularly in the Philippines.
- Basnig – Basnig is a traditional fishing technique in the Philippines.
- Flossing – Flossers are anglers who use the method of "bottom bouncing" to catch fish.
- Ice fishing – Ice fishing is the practice of catching fish with lines and fish hooks or spears through an opening in the ice on a frozen body of water.
- Cormorant fishing – Cormorant fishing is a traditional fishing method in which fishermen use trained cormorants to fish in rivers.
- Kite fishing
- Electrofishing – uses electricity to stun fish before they are caught.
- Shrimp baiting – Shrimp baiting is a method used by recreational fisherman for catching shrimp.
- Dredging – A fishing dredge, also known as a scallop dredge, oyster dredge, etc., is a kind of dredge which is towed along the bottom of the sea by a fishing boat in order to collect a targeted edible bottom-dwelling species.
- Muro-ami – The muro-ami fishing technique, employed on coral reefs in Southeast Asia, uses an encircling net together with pounding devices.
- Explosives – Blast fishing or dynamite fishing is the practice of using explosives to stun or kill schools of fish for easy collection.
- Cyanide fishing – Cyanide fishing is a method of collecting live fish mainly for use in aquariums, which involves spraying a sodium cyanide mixture into the desired fish's habitat in order to stun the fish.
- Fish toxins – Fish toxins or fish stupefying plants have historically been used by many hunter gatherer cultures to stun fish, so that the fish become easy to collect by hand.

== Fishing vessels ==
- Fishing vessel – A fishing vessel is a boat or ship used to catch fish in the sea, or on a lake or river.
- Traditional boats – The coble is a type of open traditional fishing boat which developed on the North East coast of England.
- Fishing trawler – A fishing trawler is a commercial fishing vessel designed to operate fishing trawls.
- Seiner – Seine fishing is a method of fishing that employs a seine or dragnet.
- Drifter –
- Longliner – Longline fishing is a commercial fishing technique.
- Factory ship – A factory ship, also known as a fish processing vessel, is a large ocean-going vessel with extensive on-board facilities for processing and freezing caught fish.
- Fishing fleet – A fishing fleet is an aggregate of commercial fishing vessels.
- Research vessel – A research vessel is a ship designed and equipped to carry out research at sea.
- Whalers – Whalers may refer to:
- Deadliest Catch – Deadliest Catch is a documentary/reality television series produced by Original Productions for the Discovery Channel.

=== Traditional fishing boats ===
- Traditional fishing boats
- Bawley – A Bawley was an English sailing vessel typified by a boomless cutter rig and probably named for having a boiler for cooking shrimp in amidships.
- Bokkura – Bokkura is the smallest sailing vessel used in Maldives.
- caïque –
- Cape Islander – A Cape Island style fishing boat is an inshore motor fishing boat found across Atlantic Canada having a single keeled flat bottom at the stern and more rounded towards the bow.
- Coble – The coble is a type of open traditional fishing boat which developed on the North East coast of England.
- Coracle – The coracle is a small, lightweight boat of the sort traditionally used in Wales but also in parts of Western and South Western England, Ireland, and Scotland; the word is also used of similar boats found in India, Vietnam, Iraq and Tibet.
- Couta – A couta boat is a type of boat sailed in Victoria, Australia, around Sorrento and Queenscliff and along Victoria's west coast as far west as Portland.
- Currach – A Currach is a type of Irish boat with a wooden frame, over which animal skins or hides were once stretched, though now canvas is more usual.
- Dogger – The dogger was a form of fishing boat, developed during the seventeenth century, that commonly operated in the North Sea.
- Dhoni – Dhoni or Doni is a multi-purpose sail boat with a motor or lateen sails that is used in the Maldives.
- Dugout – A dugout or dugout canoe is a boat made from a hollowed tree trunk.
- falkusa – A falkusa is a traditional fishing boat used by fishermen from the town of Komiža on the Adriatic island of Vis, Croatia.
- Felucca – A felucca is a traditional wooden sailing boat used in protected waters of the Red Sea and eastern Mediterranean including Malta, and particularly along the Nile in Egypt, Sudan, and also in Iraq.
- Fifie – The Fifie is a design of sailing boat developed on the east coast of Scotland.
- Friendship sloop – The Friendship sloop, also known as a Muscongus Bay sloop or lobster sloop, is a style of gaff-rigged sloop that originated in Friendship, Maine around 1880.
- Galway hooker – The Galway hooker is a traditional fishing boat used in Galway Bay off the west coast of Ireland.
- Herring buss – A herring buss was a type of seagoing fishing vessel, used by Dutch and Flemish herring fishermen in the 15th through early 19th centuries.
- Jangada – A Jangada is a traditional fishing boat made of wood used in the northern region of Brazil.
- Jukung – A jukung or canoe is a small wooden Indonesian boat.
- Kolae – A Kolae boat is a traditional fishing boat used in the lower southern provinces of Thailand.
- Lugger – A lugger is a class of boats, widely used as traditional fishing boats, particularly off the coasts of France, England and Scotland.
- Luzzu – A luzzu is a traditional fishing boat from the Maltese islands.
- Mackinaw – The Mackinaw boat is a loose term for a light, open sailboat used in the interior of North America during the fur trading era.
- Monterey clipper – The Monterey Clipper is a fishing boat common to the San Francisco Bay Area, the Monterey Bay Area and east to the Sacramento delta.
- Nobby – The nobby is an inshore sailing boat which was used as a traditional fishing boat around Lancashire and the Isle of Man.
- Nordland – The Nordland boat, is a type of fishing boat that has been used for centuries in northern counties of Nordland, Troms and Finnmark of Norway and derives its name from Nordland county where it has a long history.
- Pirogue – A pirogue is a small, flat-bottomed boat of a design associated particularly with the Cajuns of the Louisiana marsh.
- Poveiro – The Poveiro is a genre of fishing vessel, for coastal and deep sea fishing, mostly used in Northern Portugal from the Douro river till Galicia by the people of Póvoa de Varzim, its fisher colonies along the coast, and related communities in Northern Portugal.
- Reed boat – Reed boats and rafts, along with dugout canoes and other rafts, are among the oldest known types of boats.
- Sampan – A sampan is a relatively flat bottomed Chinese wooden boat from long.
- Sgoth – A Sgoth or Sgoth Niseach is a traditional type of clinker built skiff with a dipping lug rig and a Lateen style sail built mainly in Ness.
- Shad boat – The shad boat is a traditional fishing boat which was proclaimed the Official State Historic Boat of North Carolina by the North Carolina General Assembly in 1987.
- Sixareen – The sixareen or sixern is a traditional fishing boat used around the Shetland Islands.
- Smack – A smack was a traditional fishing boat used off the coast of England and the Atlantic coast of America for most of the 19th century, and even in small numbers up to the Second World War.
- Sneakbox – A sneakbox is a small boat that can be sailed, rowed, poled or sculled.
- Well smack – A well smack is a type of traditional fishing boat that has a well amidships.
- Yawl – A yawl is a two-masted sailing craft similar to a sloop or cutter but with an additional mast located well aft of the main mast, often right on the transom, specifically aft of the rudder post.
- Yoal – The Yoal, often referred to as the Ness Yoal, is a clinker built craft used traditionally in the Shetland Islands.

=== The dory ===
- Dory – The dory is a small, shallow-draft boat, about long.
- Banks dory – The Banks dory, also known as the Grand Banks dory, is the most common variation of the family of boats known as dories.
- Cape Ann dory – The Cape Ann dory is a traditional fishing boat, a variant of the beach dory or Swampscott dory.
- Gloucester dory – The Gloucester dory is a variant of the Banks dory, a type of narrow-bottomed, slab-sided boat, common in the North Eastern United States.
- McKenzie River dory – The McKenzie dory or Rogue River dory also called by many a Drift Boat is an evolution of the open-water dory, converted for use in rivers.
- Swampscott dory – The Swampscott dory is a traditional fishing boat, used during the middle of the 19th century by fishing villages along the coast of Massachusetts.

=== Oyster boats ===
- Bugeye –
- Deadrise – The Chesapeake Bay deadrise is a type of traditional fishing boat used in the Chesapeake Bay.
- Log canoe – The log canoe is a type of sailboat developed in the Chesapeake Bay region.
- Pungy – The pungy is a type of schooner developed in and peculiar to the Chesapeake Bay region.
- Schooners – Oyster schooners are a type of traditional fishing boat specifically designed for the harvesting of oysters.
- Sharpie – Sharpies are a type of hard chined sailboat with a flat bottom, extremely shallow draft, centerboards and straight, flaring sides.
- Skipjack – The skipjack is a traditional fishing boat used on Chesapeake Bay for oyster dredging.

=== Recreational fishing boats ===
- Bass boat – A bass boat is a small boat that is designed and equipped primarily for bass fishing or fishing for other panfish, usually in freshwater such as lakes, rivers and streams.
- Farley – Farley Boats set the standard along the Gulf Coast for fishing and sport from 1915 to the mid-1970s.

== History of fishing ==
- Traditional fishing boats
- Chasse-marée – specific, archaic type of decked commercial sailing vessel.
- Fishing in Cornwall – Fishing in Cornwall has traditionally been one of the main elements of the economy.
- Scottish east coast fishery – The Scottish east coast fishery has been in existence for more than a thousand years, spanning the Viking period right up to the present day.
- Garum – Garum, similar to liquamen, was a condiment
- Munster pilchard fishery 1570–1750
- Fishery Protection Squadron – The Fishery Protection Squadron is a front-line squadron of the Royal Navy with responsibility for patrolling the UK's Extended Fisheries Zone.
- Pearling in Western Australia – Pearling in Western Australia existed well before European settlement.
- Scania Market – The Scania Market was a major fish market for herring which took place annually in Scania during the Middle Ages.
- Harold Innis and the cod fishery – Harold Adams Innis was a professor of political economy at the University of Toronto and the author of seminal works on Canadian economic history and on media and communication theory.
- Fishing stage – wooden vernacular building, typical of the rough traditional buildings associated with the cod fishery in Newfoundland, Canada.

=== Conflicts ===
- Bering Sea Arbitration – The Bering Sea Arbitration arose out of a fishery dispute between Great Britain and the United States in the 1880s which was closed by this arbitration in 1893.
- Korean maritime border incidents (crab wars)
- Cod wars – The Cod Wars, also called the Icelandic Cod Wars, were a series of confrontations in the 1950s and 1970s between the United Kingdom and Iceland regarding fishing rights in the North Atlantic.
- Newlyn riots – The Newlyn riots were a major civil disturbance that occurred in Newlyn, Cornwall, UK on the three days beginning 18 May 1896; it arose from the local fishery and the trade in fish.
- Shetland bus – The Shetland Bus was the nickname of a clandestine special operations group that made a permanent link between Shetland, Scotland, and German-occupied Norway from 1941 until the German occupation ended on 8 May 1945.
- Turbot War – The Turbot War of 1995 was an international fishing dispute between Canada, and Spain in which Canada stopped a Galician fishing trawler in international waters and arrested its crew.

=== Disasters and memorials ===
- Stotfield fishing disaster – The Stotfield fishing disaster was the first of several fishing disasters of the 19th century on the east coast of Scotland.
- Eyemouth disaster – The Eyemouth disaster was a severe European windstorm that struck the southern coast of Scotland, United Kingdom, specifically Berwickshire, on 14 October 1881.
- Moray Firth fishing disaster – The Moray Firth fishing disaster of August 1848 was one of the worst fishing disasters in maritime history on the east coast of Scotland, and was caused by a severe storm that struck the Moray Firth.
- 2004 Morecambe Bay cockling disaster – The Morecambe Bay cockling disaster occurred on the evening of 5 February 2004 at Morecambe Bay in North West England, when at least 21 cockle pickers were drowned by an incoming tide off the Lancashire/Cumbrian coast.
- 1959 Escuminac hurricane – The 1959 Escuminac Hurricane was one of the deadliest Canadian hurricanes.
- Steveston Fisherman's Memorial – The Steveston Fisherman's Memorial is a freestanding memorial commemorating the lives and deaths of fishermen working out of Steveston, British Columbia.

=== Historic fishing culture ===
==== Historic fishing villages ====
- Fishing village – A fishing village is a village, usually located near a fishing ground, with an economy based on catching fish and harvesting seafood.
- Traditional fishing villages –
  - Akwidaa – Akwidaa is a fishing village in the Western Region of south-west Ghana, and is one of the southernmost places in Ghana.
  - Algajola – Algajola is a commune in the Haute-Corse department of France on the island of Corsica.
  - Ardglass –
  - Bermeo – Bermeo is a Spanish town and municipality in the sub-region of Busturialdea.
  - Bethsaida
  - Bolungarvík – Bolungarvík is a fishing village and municipality in the North-West of Iceland, located at the Vestfirðir peninsula, approximately 14 kilometres from the town of Ísafjörður and 473 km from the capital city Reykjavík.
  - Cadgwith – Cadgwith is a village and fishing port in Cornwall, United Kingdom.
  - Catalan Bay – Catalan Bay is a small bay and fishing village in Gibraltar, on the eastern side of The Rock away from the main city.
  - Ciboure – Ciboure is a commune in the Pyrénées-Atlantiques department in south-western France.
  - Clovelly – Clovelly is a village in the Torridge district of Devon, England.
  - Cullercoats – Cullercoats is an urban area of north east England, with a population 9,407 in 2004.
  - Dunmore East – Dunmore East is a popular tourist and fishing village in County Waterford, Ireland.
  - Ea, Biscay – Ea is a town and municipality located in the province of Biscay, in Spain.
  - Elantxobe – Elantxobe is a town and municipality located in the province of Biscay, in the autonomous community of Basque Country, northern Spain.
  - Findon – Findon or Finnan is a fishing village eight miles south of Aberdeen, famous for originating the smoked haddock known as Finnan haddie.
  - Getaria – Getaria is a coastal town located in the province of Gipuzkoa, in the autonomous community of Basque Country, in the North of Spain.
  - Guéthary – Guéthary is a commune in the Pyrénées-Atlantiques department in south-western France.
  - Gilleleje – Gilleleje is a town in Denmark with a population of 6,491.
  - Grip – Grip is an archipelago, a deserted fishing village, and a former municipality about northwest of the city of Kristiansund.
  - Gümüşlük – Gümüşlük, a seaside village and fishing port in Turkey, is situated on the remains of the ancient city of Myndos.
  - Hondarribia – Hondarribia is a town situated on the west shore of Bidasoa river's mouth, in Gipuzkoa, Basque Country, Spain.
  - Hovden – fishing community in Bø municipality in Nordland county, Norway.
  - Huanchaco – Huanchaco beach is a summer vacation spot located in the northern city of Trujillo, Peru.
  - Kaunolu Village – Kaunolū Village Site is located on the south coast of the island of Lānaʻi.
  - Ladner – Ladner was created as a fishing village on the banks of the Fraser River.
  - Lamorna – Lamorna is a fishing village and cove in west Cornwall, United Kingdom.
  - Lekeitio – Lekeitio is a town and municipality located in the province of Biscay, in the Spanish Autonomous Community of Basque Country, 53 km northeast from Bilbao.
  - Marsaxlokk – Marsaxlokk is a traditional fishing village located in the south-eastern part of Malta, with a population of 3,277 people.
  - Moskenes – Moskenes is a small village in Moskenes Municipality in Nordland county, Norway.
  - Mundaka – Mundaka is a town and municipality located in the province of Biscay, in the autonomous community of Basque Country, northern Spain.
  - Mutriku – Mutriku is a town located in the province of Gipuzkoa in the Autonomous Community of Basque Country in northern Spain.
  - Newhaven – Newhaven is a district in the City of Edinburgh, Scotland, between Leith and Granton.
  - Nyksund – Nyksund is a coastal village in Vesterålen, northern Norway.
  - Old Perlican
  - Ondarroa – Ondarroa is a town and municipality located in the province of Biscay, in the autonomous community of Basque Country, northern Spain.
  - Ona – Ona is a village and an island group located in Ålesund Municipality in Møre og Romsdal county, Norway.
  - Orio – Orio is a fishing town located in the province of Gipuzkoa in the Basque Autonomous Community, northern Spain, with the town nucleus lying on the river Oria, roughly one mile away from its mouth by the Bay of Biscay.
  - Pasaia – Pasaia is a town and municipality located in the province of Gipuzkoa in the Basque Autonomous Community of northern Spain.
  - Peggys Cove – Peggys Cove, also known as Peggy's Cove from 1961 to 1976, is a small rural community located on the eastern shore of St.
  - Pittenweem – Pittenweem is a small and secluded fishing village and civil parish tucked in the corner of Fife on the east coast of Scotland.
  - Plentzia – Plentzia is a town and municipality located in the province of Biscay, in the Autonomous Community of the Basque Country, in northern Spain.
  - Po Toi O – Po Toi O is a small fishing village
  - Polperro – Polperro is a village and fishing harbour on the south-east Cornwall coast in South West England, UK, within the civil parish of Lansallos.
  - Port Isaac – Port Isaac a.k.a.
  - Portmahomack – Portmahomack is a small fishing village in Easter Ross, Scotland.
  - Portavogie – Portavogie
  - Portofino – Portofino is a small Italian fishing village, comune and tourist resort located in the province of Genoa on the Italian Riviera.
  - St. Abbs – St.
  - Red Bay – Red Bay is a fishing village and former site of several Basque whaling stations on the southern coast of Labrador in the Province of Newfoundland and Labrador, Canada.
  - Reine – Reine is the administrative centre of Moskenes municipality, located on the northern coast of Norway, above the Arctic Circle, about 140 miles south of Tromsø.
  - Saint Malo – Saint Malo was a small fishing village that existed in St.
  - Sa Riera – is a fishing village in the province of Gerona (Spain).
  - Saint-Jean-de-Luz – Saint-Jean-de-Luz is a commune in the Pyrénées-Atlantiques department in south-western France.
  - Sayulita – Sayulita is a village about 25 miles north of downtown Puerto Vallarta in the state of Nayarit, Mexico, with a population of approximately 4,000.
  - Sigri – Sigri is a small fishing village near the western tip of Lesbos Island.
  - Staithes – Staithes is a seaside village in North Yorkshire, England.
  - Steveston – Steveston was originally a small town near Vancouver, British Columbia, but has since been absorbed into the city of Richmond, British Columbia.
  - Súðavík – Súðavík is a village and municipality and a fishing village on the west coast of Álftarfjörður in Vestfirðir, Iceland.
  - Suðureyri – Suðureyri is a small Icelandic fishing village perched on the tip of the 13 km-long Súgandafjörður in the Westfjords.
  - Tai O – Tai O is a fishing town, partly located on an island of the same name, on the western side of Lantau Island in Hong Kong.
  - Tilting – Tilting is a town on the eastern end of Fogo Island off the northeast coast of Newfoundland.
  - Udappu – Udappu or Udappuwa is a traditional Tamil fishing and shrimp farming village.
  - Vernazza – Vernazza is a town and comune located in the province of La Spezia, Liguria, northwestern Italy.
  - Walraversijde – Walraversijde is an abandoned medieval fishing village on the Belgian coast, near Ostend.
  - Zumaia – Zumaia is a small town in the north of Spain in the Basque Country.

==== Historic fishing communities ====
- Community supported fishery – A community supported fishery is a shore-side community of people collaborating with the local fishing community.
- Atlit Yam – Atlit Yam is an ancient submerged Neolithic village off the coast of Atlit, Israel.
- Halong Bay Ha Long Bay
- Lofoten – Lofoten is an archipelago and a traditional district in the county of Nordland, Norway.
- Macassan
- Newfoundland outports –
- Sørvágur – Sørvágur is a village on the island of Vágoy in the Faroe Islands.
- Tlingit
- Uru people
- Vezo – The Vezo is the term the semi-nomadic coastal people of southern Madagascar use to refer to people that have become accustomed to live from sea fishing. The Vezo speak a dialect of the Malagasy language, which is a branch of the Malayo-Polynesian language group derived from the Barito languages, spoken in southern Borneo.

== Aquatic ecosystems ==
=== Aquatic ecosystems - General ===
- Aquatic ecosystems
- Acoustic ecology – Acoustic ecology, sometimes called ecoacoustics or soundscape studies, is the relationship, mediated through sound, between living beings and their environment. Acoustic ecology studies started in the late 1960s with R.
- Algal bloom – An algal bloom is a rapid increase or accumulation in the population of algae in an aquatic system.
- Anoxic waters – Anoxic waters are areas of sea water or fresh water that are depleted of dissolved oxygen.
- Aquatic adaptation – Several animal groups have undergone aquatic adaptation, going from being purely terrestrial animals to living at least part of the time in water.
- Aquatic animals
- Aquatic biodiversity research – Aquatic biodiversity research is the field of scientific research studying marine and freshwater biological diversity
- Aquatic biomonitoring – Aquatic biomonitoring is the science of inferring the ecological condition of rivers, lakes, streams, and wetlands by examining the organisms that live there.
- Aquatic insects – Aquatic insects live some portion of their life cycle in the water.
- Aquatic layers – Any water in a sea or lake that is not close to the bottom or near to the shore can be said to be in the pelagic zone.
- Aquatic plants Aquatic plant
- Aquatic predation – Aquatic predation presents a special difficulty as compared to predation on land, because the density of water is about the same as that of the prey, so that the prey tends to be pushed away.
- Aquatic respiration – Aquatic respiration is the process whereby an aquatic animal obtains oxygen from water.
- Aquatic science – Aquatic Science is the multidisciplinary study of aquatic systems, encompassing both freshwater and marine systems.
- Aquatic toxicology – Aquatic toxicology is the study of the effects of manufactured chemicals and other anthropogenic and natural materials and activities on aquatic organisms at various levels of organization, from subcellular through individual organisms to communities and ecosystems.
- Benthos – Benthos refers to species living in or on the ocean bottom and represent the greatest proportion of marine species.
- Bioluminescence – Bioluminescence is the production and emission of light by a living organism.
- Biomass – Biomass, in ecology, is the mass of living biological organisms in a given area or ecosystem at a given time.
- Cascade effect – An ecological cascade effect is a series of secondary extinctions that is triggered by the primary extinction of a key species in an ecosystem.
- Colored dissolved organic matter – Colored dissolved organic matter is the optically measurable component of the dissolved organic matter in water.
- Dead zone – Dead zones are hypoxic areas in the world's oceans, the observed incidences of which have been increasing since oceanographers began noting them in the 1970s.
- Ecohydrology – Ecohydrology "; hydōr, "water"; and, -logia is an interdisciplinary field studying the interactions between water and ecosystems.
- Eutrophication – Eutrophication or more precisely hypertrophication, is the ecosystem response to the addition of artificial or natural substances, such as nitrates and phosphates, through fertilizers or sewage, to an aquatic system.
- Fisheries science – Fisheries science is the academic discipline of managing and understanding fisheries.
- Food chain – A food chain is somewhat a linear sequence of links in a food web starting from a trophic species that eats no other species in the web and ends at a trophic species that is eaten by no other species in the web.
- Food web – A food web depicts feeding connections in an ecological community.
- Hydrobiology – Hydrobiology is the science of life and life processes in water.
- Hypoxia – Hypoxia, or oxygen depletion, is a phenomenon that occurs in aquatic environments as dissolved oxygen becomes reduced in concentration to a point where it becomes detrimental to aquatic organisms living in the system.
- Microbial ecology – Microbial ecology is the ecology of microorganisms: their relationship with one another and with their environment.
- Microbial food web – The microbial food web refers the combined trophic interactions among microbes in aquatic environments.
- Microbial loop – a trophic pathway in the marine microbial food web where dissolved organic carbon is returned to higher trophic levels via the incorporation into bacterial biomass, and coupled with the classic food chain formed by phytoplankton-zooplankton-nekton.
- Nekton – Nekton refers to the aggregate of actively swimming aquatic organisms in a body of water able to move independently of water currents.
- Neuston – Neuston is the collective term for the organisms that float on the top of water or live right under the surface.
- Particle – In marine and freshwater ecology, a particle is a small object.
- Photic zone – The photic zone or euphotic zone is the depth of the water in a lake or ocean that is exposed to sufficient sunlight for photosynthesis to occur.
- Phytoplankton – Phytoplankton are the autotrophic component of the plankton community.
- Plankton – Plankton are any drifting organisms that inhabit the pelagic zone of oceans, seas, or bodies of fresh water.
- Productivity – In ecology, productivity or production refers to the rate of generation of biomass in an ecosystem.
- Ramsar Convention – The Ramsar Convention is an international treaty for the conservation and sustainable utilization of wetlands,
- Schooling – In biology, any group of fish that stay together for social reasons are shoaling, and if the group is swimming in the same direction in a coordinated manner, they are schooling.
- Sediment trap – Sediment traps are instruments used in oceanography to measure the quantity of sinking particulate organic material in aquatic systems, usually oceans.
- Siltation – Siltation is the pollution of water by fine particulate terrestrial clastic material, with a particle size dominated by silt or clay.
- Spawning – Spawn refers to the eggs and sperm released or deposited, usually into water, by aquatic animals.
- Substrate – Stream substrate is the material that rests at the bottom of a stream.
- Thermal pollution – Thermal pollution is the degradation of water quality by any process that changes ambient water temperature.
- Trophic level –
- Underwater camouflage and mimicry – Underwater camouflage and mimicry is a technique of crypsis—avoidance of observation—that allows an otherwise visible aquatic organism to remain indiscernible from the surrounding environment, or pretend to be something else by mimicking another organism or object.
- Water column – A water column is a conceptual column of water from surface to bottom sediments.
- Zooplankton – Zooplankton are heterotrophic plankton.

=== Fresh water ecosystems ===
- Freshwater ecosystems
- Brackish marsh – Brackish marshes develop by salt marshes where a significant freshwater influx dilute the seawater to brackish levels of salinity.
- Freshwater biology – Freshwater biology is the scientific biological study of freshwater ecosystems and is a branch of Limnology.
- Freshwater biomes –
- Freshwater fish – Freshwater fish are fish that spend some or all of their lives in fresh water, such as rivers and lakes, with a salinity of less than 0.05%.
- Freshwater marsh – A freshwater marsh is a marsh that contains fresh water.
- Freshwater swamp forest – Freshwater swamp forests, or flooded forests,
- Hyporheic zone – The hyporheic zone is a region beneath and alongside a stream bed, where there is mixing of shallow groundwater and surface water.
- Lake ecosystems
- Landscape limnology – Landscape limnology is the spatially explicit study of lakes, streams, and wetlands as they interact with the freshwater, terrestrial, and human landscapes to determine the effects of pattern on ecosystem processes across temporal and spatial scales.
- Limnology – Limnology, also called freshwater science, is the study of inland waters.
- Lake stratification – Lake stratification is the separation of lakes into three layers:
- Macrophyte – A macrophyte is an aquatic plant that grows in or near water and is either emergent, submergent, or floating.
- Pond – A pond is a body of standing water, either natural or man-made, that is usually smaller than a lake.
- Fish pond – A fish pond, or fishpond, is a controlled pond, artificial lake, or reservoir that is stocked with fish and is used in aquaculture for fish farming, or is used for recreational fishing or for ornamental purposes.
- Rheotaxis – Rheotaxis is a form of taxis seen in many aquatic organisms, e.g., fish, whereby they will turn to face into an oncoming current.
- River ecosystems River ecosystem
- Stream bed – A stream bed is the channel bottom of a stream, river or creek; the physical confine of the normal water flow.
- Stream pool – A stream pool, in hydrology, is a stretch of a river or stream in which the water depth is above average and the water velocity is quite below average.
- Trophic state index – primary determinants of a body of water's trophic state index.
- Upland and lowland – In studies of the ecology of freshwater rivers, habitats are classified as upland and lowland.
- Water garden –
- Wetland – A wetland is a land area that is saturated with water, either permanently or seasonally, such that it takes on characteristics that distinguish it as a distinct ecosystem.
- Environmental quality – Freshwater environmental quality parameters are the natural and man-made chemical, biological and microbiological characteristics of rivers, lakes and ground-waters, the ways they are measured and the ways that they change.

=== Ecoregions ===
Ecoregions

- Ecology of the Everglades – The geography and ecology of the Everglades involve the complex elements affecting the natural environment throughout the southern region of the U.S.
- Freshwater ecology of Maharashtra – College of Fisheries, Shirgaon, Ratnagiri

=== Marine ecosystem ===
Marine ecosystem – Marine ecosystems are among the largest of Earth's aquatic ecosystems.

- f-ratio – In oceanic biogeochemistry, the f-ratio is the fraction of total primary production fuelled by nitrate.
- Iron fertilization – Iron fertilization is the intentional introduction of iron to the upper ocean to stimulate a phytoplankton bloom.
- Iron Hypothesis – The Iron Hypothesis was formulated by oceanographer John Martin, based on theories by Joseph Hart and first tested in 1993.
- Large marine ecosystem – Large marine ecosystems are regions of the world's oceans, encompassing coastal areas from river basins and estuaries to the seaward boundaries of continental shelves and the outer margins of the major ocean current systems.
- Marine biology – Marine biology is the scientific study of organisms in the ocean or other marine or brackish bodies of water.
- Marine chemistry
- Marine snow – In the deep ocean, marine snow is a continuous shower of mostly organic detritus falling from the upper layers of the water column.
- Ocean nourishment – Ocean Nourishment is a type of geoengineering based on the purposeful introduction of nutrients to the upper ocean to increase marine food production and to sequester carbon dioxide from the atmosphere.
- Ocean turbidity – Ocean turbidity is a measure of the amount of cloudiness or haziness in sea water caused by individual particles that are too small to be seen without magnification.
- Photophore – A photophore is a light-emitting organ which appears as luminous spots on various marine animals, including fish and cephalopods.
- Thorson's rule – Thorson's rule
- Upwelling – Upwelling is an oceanographic phenomenon that involves wind-driven motion of dense, cooler, and usually nutrient-rich water towards the ocean surface, replacing the warmer, usually nutrient-depleted surface water.
- Whale fall – A whale fall is a whale carcass that has fallen to the ocean floor.

=== Marine life ===
- Census of Marine Life – The Census of Marine Life was a global network of researchers in more than 80 nations engaged in a 10-year scientific initiative to assess and explain the diversity, distribution, and abundance of life in the oceans.
- Coastal fish – Coastal fish, also called offshore fish or neritic fish, are fish that inhabit the sea between the shoreline and the edge of the continental shelf.
- Coral reef fish – Coral reef fish are fish which live amongst or in close relation to coral reefs.
- Deep sea communities – Deep sea communities currently remain largely unexplored, due to the technological and logististical challenges and expense involved in visiting these remote biomes.
- Deep sea creature – The term deep sea creature refers to organisms that live below the photic zone of the ocean.
- Deep sea fish – Deep-sea fish is a term for any fish that lives below the photic zone of the ocean.
- Deep-water coral – The habitat of deep-water corals, also known as cold-water corals, extends to deeper, darker parts of the oceans than tropical corals, ranging from near the surface to the abyss, beyond where water temperatures may be as cold as 4 °C.
- Demersal fish – Demersal fish live on or near the bottom of the sea or lakes.
- Marine bacteriophage – Marine bacteriophages or marine phages are viruses that live as obligate parasitic agents in marine bacteria such as cyanobacteria. Their existence was discovered through electron microscopy and epifluorescence microscopy of ecological water samples, and later through metagenomic sampling of uncultured viral samples.
- Marine invertebrates – Marine invertebrates are multicellular animals that inhabit a marine environment and are invertebrates, lacking a vertebral column.
- Marine larval ecology – Marine larval ecology is the study of the factors influencing the dispersing larval stage which is exhibited by many marine invertebrates and fishes.
- Marine mammal – Marine mammals, which include seals, whales, dolphins, and walruses, form a diverse group of 128 species that rely on the ocean for their existence. They do not represent a distinct biological grouping, but rather are unified by their reliance on the marine environment for feeding. Marine mammals can be subdivided into four recognised groups; cetaceans (whales, dolphins and porpoises), pinnipeds (seals, sea lions and walruses), sirenians (manatees and dugongs), and fissipeds, which are the group of carnivores with separate digits (the polar bear, and two species of otter). Both cetaceans and sirenians are fully aquatic and therefore are obligate ocean dwellers. Pinnipeds are semi-aquatic; they spend the majority of their time in the water, but need to return to land for important activities such as mating, breeding and molting. In contrast, both otters and the polar bear are much less adapted to ocean living. While the number of marine mammals is small compared to those found on land, their total biomass is large. They play important roles in maintaining marine ecosystems, especially through regulation of prey populations. The level of dependence on the marine environment for existence varies considerably with species.
- Marine reptile – Marine reptiles are reptiles which have become secondarily adapted for an aquatic or semi-aquatic life in a marine environment.
- Marine vertebrate – Marine vertebrates are vertebrates which live in a marine environment.
- Paradox of the plankton – In aquatic biology, the paradox of the plankton is the name given to the situation where a limited range of resources supports a much wider range of planktonic organisms.
- Pelagic fish – Pelagic fish live near the surface or in the water column of coastal, ocean and lake waters, but not on the bottom of the sea or the lake.
- Seabird – Seabirds are birds that have adapted to life within the marine environment.
- Seashore wildlife – Seashore wildlife Habitats exist from the Tropics to the Arctic and Antarctic.
- Wild fisheries – A fishery is an area with an associated fish or aquatic population which is harvested for its commercial value. Fisheries can be marine or freshwater. They can also be wild or farmed.

=== Marine habitats ===
Marine habitats – The sedimentologist Francis Shepard classified coasts as primary or secondary.

- Bay mud – Bay mud consists of thick deposits of soft, unconsolidated silty clay, which is saturated with water; these soil layers are situated at the bottom of certain estuaries, which are normally in temperate regions that have experienced cyclical glacial cycles.
- Black smokers Hydrothermal vent
- Estuaries – An estuary is a partly enclosed coastal body of water with one or more rivers or streams flowing into it, and with a free connection to the open sea.
- Intertidal ecology – Intertidal ecology is the study of intertidal ecosystems, where organisms live between the low and high tide lines.
- Intertidal wetlands –
- Kelp forests
- Lagoons
- Biome § Marine biomes
- Marine habitats – The sedimentologist Francis Shepard classified coasts as primary or secondary.
- Mudflats
- Rocky shores –
- Salt marshes
- Seagrass meadows – Seagrasses are flowering plants from one of four plant families, all in the order Alismatales, which grow in marine, fully saline environments.
- Sponge reefs –
- Tide pools

=== Issues ===
- Ecological values of mangrove – Mangrove ecosystems represent natural capital capable of producing a wide range of goods and services for coastal environments and communities and society as a whole.
- Fisheries and climate change – * Brander, Keith (2010). "Impacts of climate change on fisheries" (PDF). Journal of Marine Systems. 79 (3–4): 389–402. Bibcode:2010JMS....79..389B. doi:10.1016/j.jmarsys.2008.12.015. Archived from the original (PDF) on 2016-03-05.
- HERMIONE – Hotspot Ecosystem Research and Man's Impact On European Seas, or HERMIONE, is an international multidisciplinary project, started in April 2009, that studies deep-sea ecosystems. HERMIONE scientists study the distribution of hotspot ecosystems, how they function and how they interconnect, partially in the context of how these ecosystems are being affected by climate change and impacted by humans through fishing, resource extraction, seabed installations and pollution.
- Marine conservation – Marine conservation, also known as marine resources conservation, is the protection and preservation of ecosystems in oceans and seas.
- Marine conservation activism – Marine conservation activism refers to the efforts of non-governmental organizations and individuals to bring about social and political change in the area of marine conservation.
- Marine pollution – Marine pollution occurs when harmful, or potentially harmful effects, can result from the entry into the ocean of chemicals, particles, industrial, agricultural and residential waste, noise, or the spread of invasive organisms.
- Marine Protected Area

=== Other environmental concerns regarding fishing ===
- Environmental impact of fishing
- Overfishing – Overfishing is the act whereby fish stocks are depleted to unacceptable levels, regardless of water body size.
  - Fishing down the food web – Fishing down the food web is the process whereby fisheries in a given ecosystem, "having depleted the large predatory fish on top of the food web, turn to increasingly smaller species, finally ending up with previously spurned small fish and invertebrates".
- Population dynamics of fisheries – * Birth rate or recruitment.
- Sustainable seafood – Sustainable seafood is seafood from either fished or farmed sources that can maintain or increase production in the future without jeopardizing the ecosystems from which it was acquired.
- Tragedy of the commons – The tragedy of the commons is a dilemma arising from the situation in which multiple individuals, acting independently and rationally consulting their own self-interest, will ultimately deplete a shared limited resource, even when it is clear that it is not in anyone's long-term interest for this to happen.
- Marine conservation – Marine conservation, also known as marine resources conservation, is the protection and preservation of ecosystems in oceans and seas.
  - Marine conservation activism – Marine conservation activism refers to the efforts of non-governmental organizations and individuals to bring about social and political change in the area of marine conservation.
- Marine debris – Marine debris, also known as marine litter, is human created waste that has deliberately or accidentally become afloat in a lake, sea, ocean or waterway.
- Marine pollution – Marine pollution occurs when harmful, or potentially harmful effects, can result from the entry into the ocean of chemicals, particles, industrial, agricultural and residential waste, noise, or the spread of invasive organisms.
- Marine Protected Area
- Marine Stewardship Council – The Marine Stewardship Council is an independent non-profit organization which sets a standard for sustainable fishing.

== Fisheries ==
Fishery – entity engaged in raising or harvesting fish which is determined by some authority to be a fishery. According to the UN Food and Agriculture Organization (FAO), a fishery is typically defined in terms of the "people involved, species or type of fish, area of water or seabed, method of fishing, class of boats, purpose of the activities or a combination of the foregoing features". The definition often includes a combination of fish and fishers in a region, the latter fishing for similar species with similar gear types. Fishery –

- Fisheries science – Fisheries science is the academic discipline of managing and understanding fisheries.
- Wild fisheries – A fishery is an area with an associated fish or aquatic population which is harvested for its commercial value. Fisheries can be marine or freshwater. They can also be wild or farmed.
- Fisheries management – Fisheries management draws on fisheries science in order to find ways to protect fishery resources so sustainable exploitation is possible.
- Sustainable fishery –
- Marine conservation – Marine conservation, also known as marine resources conservation, is the protection and preservation of ecosystems in oceans and seas.

== Commercial fishing ==
- Commercial fishing – Commercial fishing is the activity of catching fish and other seafood for commercial profit, mostly from wild fisheries.

=== Types of commercial fishing ===
- Trawling – Trawling is a method of fishing that involves pulling a fishing net through the water behind one or more boats.
- Seine fishing – Seine fishing is a method of fishing that employs a seine or dragnet.
- Longline fishing – Longline fishing is a commercial fishing technique.
- Trolling (fishing)
- Fishing dredge
- Trepanging – Trepanging is the Anglicisation of the act of collection or harvesting of sea cucumbers, known in Indonesian, as "trepang".
- Lobster fishing – Lobster fishing, sometimes called lobstering, is the commercial or recreational harvesting of marine lobsters, spiny lobsters or crayfish.
- Alaskan king crab fishing – Alaskan king crab fishing is carried out during the winter months in the waters off the coast of Alaska and the Aleutian Islands.
- Artisan fishing – small-scale low-technology commercial or subsistence fishing practices.
- Fishing vessel – A fishing vessel is a boat or ship used to catch fish in the sea, or on a lake or river.

=== Commercial fishing boats ===
- Trawlers – A fishing trawler is a commercial fishing vessel designed to operate fishing trawls.
- Seiners – Seine fishing is a method of fishing that employs a seine or dragnet.
- Drifters –
- Longliners – Longline fishing is a commercial fishing technique.
- Factory ships –
- Fishery Protection Squadron – The Fishery Protection Squadron is a front-line squadron of the Royal Navy with responsibility for patrolling the UK's Extended Fisheries Zone.
- Fishing fleet – A fishing fleet is an aggregate of commercial fishing vessels.
- Research vessels
- Whalers –

=== Fishing by country ===
- Fishing by country
- Fishing industry by country
- Alaska – :The deck hands take care of all of the tasks that need to be done on board during a set, such as detaching the skiff at the start of a set, plunging to scare fish away from the boat where they could escape the net by going under the boat, and cleaning the deck of seaweed and bycatch while the net is deployed, keeping an eye on the net and surrounding seas for snags or whales, stacking the cork line and lead line as the net is being taken back aboard, removing the odd fish/debris that has become entangled in the net, assisting with brailing, repairing holes in the net, pitching the fish into the fish hold, and on most boats cooking the meals.
- Chile – Fishing in Chile is a major industry with a total catch of 4,442,877 tons of fishes in 2006. Due to the Humboldt Current the Chilean Sea is considered among the most productive marine ecosystems in the world as well as the largest upwelling system.
- Ghana – Fishing in Ghana increased considerably in the late 1960s, from 105,100 tons of marine fish caught in 1967 to 230,100 tons in 1971.
- India – Fishing in India is a major industry in its coastal states, employing over 14 million people.
- Scotland – The fishing industry in Scotland comprises a significant proportion of the United Kingdom fishing industry.

== Recreational fishing ==
- Recreational fishing – Recreational fishing, also called sport fishing, is fishing for pleasure or competition.
- Angling – Angling is a method of fishing by means of an "angle".
- Fly fishing – Fly fishing is an angling method in which an artificial 'fly' is used to catch fish.
- Game fish – Game fish are fish pursued for sport by recreational anglers.
- Fishing techniques – Fishing techniques are methods for catching fish.
- Fishing tackle – the equipment used by fishermen when fishing.
- Personalities – Sheridan Andreas Mulholland Anderson was an American outdoorsman, fly fisherman, author, and illustrator.

== Angling topics ==
=== Angling and game fishing ===
- Angling – Angling is a method of fishing by means of an "angle".
  - Boat fishing – Inshore boat fishing is fishing from a boat in easy sight of land and in water less than about 30 metres deep.
  - Trolling – method of fishing where one or more fishing lines, baited with lures or bait fish, are drawn through the water.
  - Casting – In angling, casting is the act of throwing bait or a lure using a fishing line out over the water using a flexible fishing rod.
  - Spey casting – Spey casting is a casting technique used in fly fishing.
  - Reach cast – The Reach Cast is a casting technique used in fly fishing.
  - Surf fishing – Surf fishing is the sport of catching fish standing on the shoreline or wading in the surf.
  - Rock fishing – Rock fishing is fishing from rocky outcrops into the sea.
  - Bank fishing – Bank fishing is fishing from river banks and shorelines.
  - Kayak fishing – Kayak fishing is fishing from a kayak.
  - Centerpin fishing – Centerpin fishing, also called float fishing, is a fishing technique which uses a noodle or mooching rod, reel and Roe or fly.
  - Coarse fish – Coarse fishing is a term used in the United Kingdom and Ireland for angling for coarse fish, which are those types of freshwater fish other than game fish.
  - Rough fish – Rough fish is a term used by U.S.
  - Bottom fishing – Bottom fishing, called legering in the United Kingdom, is fishing the bottom of a body of water.
  - Tackle – the equipment used by fishermen when fishing.
  - Techniques – Fishing techniques are methods for catching fish.
  - Tournaments – A fishing tournament, or derby, is an organised competition among anglers.
  - Traditional fishing boats
  - Angling personalities – Sheridan Andreas Mulholland Anderson was an American outdoorsman, fly fisherman, author, and illustrator.
  - game fishing – Game fish are fish pursued for sport by recreational anglers.
  - Big-game fishing – Big-game fishing, often referred to as offshore sportfishing, offshore gamefishing, or blue-water fishing is a form of recreational fishing, targeting large fish renowned for their sporting qualities, such as tuna and marlin.
  - Land-based game fishing – Land-based game fishing is a form of fishing where anglers attempt to catch game fish, that are generally caught from ocean-going boats, off the shore.
  - Salmon run – The salmon run is the time when salmon, which have migrated from the ocean, swim to the upper reaches of rivers where they spawn on gravel beds.
  - International Game Fish Association – leading authority on angling pursuits and the keeper of the most current World Record fishing catches by fish categories.

=== The catch ===
- Catch and release – Catch and release is a practice within recreational fishing intended as a technique of conservation.
- Tag and release – Tag and release is a form of catch and release fishing in which the angler attaches a tag to the fish, records data such as date, time, place, and type of fish on a standardized post card, and submits this card to a fisheries agency or conservation organization.
- Bag limits – A bag limit is a law imposed on hunters and fishermen restricting the number of animals within a specific species or group of species they may kill and keep.
- Minimum landing size – The minimum landing size is the smallest length at which it is legal to keep or sell a fish.
- Panfish – A panfish, also spelled pan-fish or pan fish, is an edible game fish that usually doesn't outgrow the size of a frying pan.
- Priest (tool) – A priest is a tool, often resembling a blunt weapon, used for quickly killing fish.
- Ike jime – or is a method of paralyzing and bleeding fish to maintain its quality.

=== Sport fish ===
- Bass – Bass fishing is the activity of angling for the North American gamefish known colloquially as the black bass.
- Carp – Good carp fishing can be found in many different types of water.
- Mahi-mahi – Mahi mahi are also known as dorado or dolphin fish.
- Marlin – Marlin fishing is considered by some game fishermen to be the pinnacle of offshore game fishing, due to the size and power of marlin and the relative rareness and vulnerability of this species.
- Porgie (bream) – Porgy is the common name for any fish which belongs to the family Sparidae.
- Smelt whiting – Smelt-whiting is the common name for various species of the family Sillaginidae.

=== Fly fishing ===
- Fly fishing – angling method in which an artificial 'fly' is used to catch fish.
  - Fly fishing tackle – fishing tackle or equipment typically used by fly anglers.
  - Bamboo fly rod – fly fishing rod that is made from bamboo, also referred to as cane.
  - Fly rod building – art of constructing a fly fishing rod to match the performance desires of the individual angler.
  - Fly Casting Analyzer – research tool for understanding fly casting
  - Spey casting – casting technique used in fly fishing.
  - Reach cast – casting technique used in fly fishing.
  - Tenkara fishing – traditional type of fly fishing practiced in Japan.
  - Float tube – also known as a belly boat or kick boat, is a flotation device which anglers use to fish from.
  - Trout bum – affectionate nickname for dedicated trout anglers, particularly those who practice fly fishing.
  - Fly waters – tributary of the Jefferson River, approximately 153 miles long, in southwestern Montana in the United States.
  - Bibliography of fly fishing – provides an overview of notable and not so notable works in the English language regarding the sport of fly fishing, listed by year of first publication.

==== Artificial flies ====
- Fly lure – type of fishing lure, usually used in the sport of fly fishing.
  - Fly tying – process of producing an artificial fly to be used by anglers to catch fish via means of fly fishing.
  - Amadou – spongy, flammable substance prepared from bracket fungi.
  - Cul De Canard – feathers from the back of the duck directly around the preen gland; they are very buoyant due to preen oil produced by the preen gland.
  - Trolling tandem streamer fly – style of fishing fly designed to be fished behind a moving boat.
  - Royal Coachman – artificial fly that has been tied as a wet fly, dry fly and streamer pattern.
  - Clouser Deep Minnow – artificial fly commonly categorized as a streamer and is fished under the water surface.
  - Diawl bach – popular Welsh fly pattern used in British still waters, and an appropriate lure to use when the fish are feeding on midge pupae.
  - Egg sucking leech – artificial fly used in fly fishing.
  - Flesh Fly – popular fly pattern used by rainbow trout anglers in Western Alaska.
  - Grey Ghost Streamer – artificial fly, of the streamer type.
  - Hare's Ear – one of the most traditional artificial flies used in fly fishing.
  - Klinkhammer – popular Emerger used in fly fishing to catch grayling and trout.
  - Muddler Minnow – popular and versatile artificial fly of the streamer type used in fly fishing and fly tying.
  - Partridge and Orange – artificial fly commonly categorized as a wet fly or soft hackle and is fished under the water surface.
  - Woolly Worm – artificial fly commonly categorized as a wet fly or nymph and is fished under the water surface.
  - Woolly Bugger – artificial fly commonly categorized as a wet fly or streamer and is fished under the water surface.

==== Fly fishing organizations ====
- American Museum of Fly Fishing – The American Museum of Fly Fishing is a museum in Manchester, Vermont, USA, that preserves and exhibits artifacts related to American angling.
- Catskill Fly Fishing Center and Museum – The Catskill Fly Fishing Center and Museum is a nonprofit, educational organization dedicated to: preserving America's fly fishing heritage; teaching its future generations of fly fishers; and protecting its fly fishing environment.
- Federation of Fly Fishers – The Federation of Fly Fishers is an international 501 non-profit organization headquartered in Livingston, Montana dedicated to the betterment of the sport of fly fishing through Conservation, Restoration and Education.
- Trout Unlimited – Trout Unlimited is an international non-profit organization dedicated to the conservation of freshwater streams, rivers, and associated upland habitats for trout, salmon, other aquatic species, and people.

==== Fly fishing literature ====
- Blacker's Art of Fly Making – Blacker's Art of Fly Making - comprising angling and dyeing of colours with engravings of Salmon and Trout flies shewing the process of the gentle craft as taught in the pages with descriptions of flies for the season of the year as they come out on the water is a work of fly tying literature with significant fly fishing content written by William Blacker, a London Tackle dealer and first published in London in 1842 by George Nichols
- A Book on Angling – A Book on Angling - Being a complete treatise on the art of angling in every branch is a work of angling literature with significant fly fishing content written by Francis Francis, angling editor to The Field
- A Concise Treatise on the Art of Angling – A Concise Treatise on the Art of Angling- Confirmed by Actual Experiences and Minute Observations to Which is Added the Compleat Fly-Fisher is a fly fishing book written by Thomas Best, first published in London in 1787.
- Dry-Fly Fishing in Theory and Practice – Dry-Fly Fishing in Theory and Practice is British author and angler Frederic M.
- Favorite Flies and Their Histories – Favorite Flies and Their Histories - With many replies from practical anglers to inquiries concerning how, when and where to use them-Illustrated by Thirty-two colored plates of flies, six engravings of natural insects and eight reproductions of photographs is a fly fishing book written by Mary Orvis Marbury published in Boston in April 1892 by Houghton Mifflin.
- Floating Flies and How to Dress Them – Floating Flies and How to Dress Them - A Treatise on the Most Modern Methods of Dressing Artificial Flies for Trout and Grayling with Full Illustrated Directions and Containing Ninety Hand-Coloured Engravings of the Most Killing Patterns Together with a Few Hints to Dry-Fly Fishermen is a fly fishing book written by Frederic M.
- The Fly-fisher's Entomology – The Fly-Fisher's Entomology, Illustrated by Coloured Representations of the Natural and Artificial Insect and Accompanied by a Few Observations and Instructions Relative to Trout-and-Grayling Fishing, first published in 1836 by Alfred Ronalds, was the first comprehensive work related to the entomology associated with fly fishing.
- A History of Fly Fishing for Trout – A History of Fly Fishing for Trout is a fly fishing book written by John Waller Hills published in London in 1921.
- Minor Tactics of the Chalk Stream – Minor Tactics of the Chalk Stream and Kindred Studies is a fly fishing book written by G.E.M.
- Pseudonyms of notable angling authors List of pseudonyms of angling authors
- The Salmon Fly – The Salmon Fly - How to Dress It and How to Use It is a fly fishing book written by George M.
- The Way of a Trout with the Fly – The Way of a Trout with the Fly and Some Further Studies in Minor Tactics is a fly fishing book written by G.

==== Apparel ====
- Hip boot – Hip boots, or waders as they are colloquially called, are a type of boot initially designed to be worn by river fishermen.
- Waders (footwear) – Waders refers to a waterproof boot extending from the foot to the chest, traditionally made from vulcanised rubber, but available in more modern PVC, neoprene and Gore-Tex variants.
- Diving mask – A diving mask is an item of diving equipment that allows scuba divers, free-divers, and snorkelers to see clearly underwater.
- Wetsuit – A wetsuit is a garment, usually made of foamed neoprene, which is worn by surfers, divers, windsurfers, canoeists, and others engaged in water sports, providing thermal insulation, abrasion resistance and buoyancy.

=== Sport fish targets ===
- American shad
- Barramundi
- Cobia
- Coho salmon
- Hickory shad
- King mackerel
- Mahimahi
- Sand whiting
- Silver carp
- Striped bass
- Thresher shark
- Tuna
- Walleye
- More sport fish

==== Fly fishing targets ====
- Bluefish
- Brook trout
- Crappie
- Hucho taimen
- Largemouth bass
- Northern pike
- Peacock bass
- Shoal bass
- Smallmouth bass
- Other sport fish...

=== Sport fishing by location ===
- Hunting and fishing in Alaska – Hunting and fishing in Alaska are common both for recreation and subsistence.
- Fish in Australia – There are many types of fish in Australia, and fishing is a popular Australian activity.
- Golden Triangle (Rocky Mountains) – The Golden Triangle is an informal designation for a region renowned as one of the premier fly fishing locations in the United States.
- Redmire pool – Redmire Pool is near Ross-on-Wye in Herefordshire, England.
- Angling in Yellowstone National Park – Angling in Yellowstone National Park is a major reason many visitors come to the park each year and since it was created in 1872, the park has drawn anglers from around the world to fish its waters.

==== Fly fishing waters ====
- Big Hole River – The Big Hole River is a tributary of the Jefferson River, approximately 153 miles long, in southwestern Montana in the United States.
- DePuy Spring Creek – DePuy Spring Creek is a three mile long trout fishery located between the Absaroka and Gallatin mountain ranges in Paradise Valley, south of Livingston, Montana.
- East Gallatin River – The East Gallatin River flows in a northwesterly direction through the Gallatin valley, Gallatin County, Montana.
- Firehole River – The Firehole River is one of two major tributaries of the Madison River.
- Gibbon River – The Gibbon River is a river in Yellowstone National Park, in Wyoming, the United States.
- River Test – The River Test is a river in Hampshire, England.
- Ruby River – The Ruby River is a tributary of the Beaverhead River, approximately 76 mi long, in southwestern Montana in the United States.
- San Juan River – The San Juan River is a significant tributary of the Colorado River in the southwestern United States, about long.
- Angling in Yellowstone National Park – Angling in Yellowstone National Park is a major reason many visitors come to the park each year and since it was created in 1872, the park has drawn anglers from around the world to fish its waters.
- Yellowstone River – The Yellowstone River is a tributary of the Missouri River, approximately long, in the western United States.

== Fishing tournaments ==
- tournaments – A fishing tournament, or derby, is an organised competition among anglers.
- Argungu Fishing Festival – The Argungu Fishing Festival is an annual four-day festival in north-western Nigerian state of Kebbi.
- Bass Festival – The Bass Festival, also known as Bass Derby, is held during the second weekend of October in Rio Vista, California.
- Bassmasters Classic Bassmaster Classic
- Fort Frances Canadian Bass Championship – The Fort Frances Canadian Bass Championship is a catch and release smallmouth bass fishing tournament held on Rainy Lake and hosted in Fort Frances, Ontario.
- Golden North Salmon Derby – The Golden North Salmon Derby is an annual salmon fishing competition held in Juneau, Alaska in August.
- Jacksonville Kingfish Tournament – The AT&T Greater Jacksonville Kingfish Tournament is a contest fishing for King mackerel that spans six days every July in Jacksonville, Florida.
- Troutmasters – Troutmasters is the name of an annual fishing tournament taking place in the Wilson's Creek district of Pisgah National Forest in Western North Carolina.

== Fishing organizations ==
- Bass Anglers Sportsman Society – The Bass Anglers Sportsman Society is a fishing membership organization with more than a half a million members.
- Central New England Fishery Resource Office – The Central New England Fishery Resource Office is involved in programs to restore, enhance, and manage a number of migratory fish species and the habitats they depend upon.
- Common Fisheries Policy – The Common Fisheries Policy is the fisheries policy of the European Union.
- Fish and Game New Zealand – Fish and Game New Zealand is a statutory body set up to advocate for recreational hunting and fishing in New Zealand.
- Fisherfolk Movement – The Fisherfolk Movement is a coalition of eight federation and alliances of small fisherfolk in the Philippines.
- Fishingkaki – Fishingkaki.com is one of the world's largest fishing internet-based message board and is based in Singapore.
- Gerakan Nelajan Marhaenis – Gerakan Nelajan Marhaenis was an organization of fishermen in Indonesia, linked to the Indonesian Nationalist Party. GNM was part of the Marhaen Mass Movement. GNM held its first congress in Tegal in July 1965.
- Global Anglers Federation – The Global Anglers Federation is a fishing membership organization for any angler including those who hold records for landing the largest fish of a species. Open to any fisherman interested in preserving fish populations and fishing adventures.
- International Collective in Support of Fishworkers – International Collective in Support of Fishworkers is an international non-government organization that works towards the establishment of equitable, gender-just, self-reliant and sustainable fisheries, particularly in the small-scale, artisan sector.
- International Game Fish Association – The International Game Fish Association is the leading authority on angling pursuits and the keeper of the most current World Record fishing catches by fish categories.
- International Land-Based Shark Fishing Association – The International Land-Based Shark Fishing Association was formed to unify the sport of land-based shark fishing and its anglers by establish of the standards for the compilation and recognition of world records, while also promoting, through research, education and practice, responsible enjoyment and stewardship of marine and coastal resources.
- Izaak Walton League – The Izaak Walton League is an American environmental organization founded in 1922 that promotes natural resource protection and outdoor recreation.
- Marine Management Organisation – The Marine Management Organisation is an executive non-departmental public body established and given powers under the Marine and Coastal Access Act 2009
- Nippon Bass Club – The Nippon Bass Club is the largest amateur sports fishing club in Japan.
- North Pacific Longliners Association – The North Pacific Longliners Association is a trade group that represents the largest longliners.
- Pakistan Fisherfolk Forum – The Pakistan Fisherfolk Forum is a non-governmental organisation based in Karachi, Pakistan which works to advance social, economic, cultural and political rights of fishermen and fishing communities in Pakistan.
- Prince Albert Angling Society – The Prince Albert Angling Society is a fishing club in the United Kingdom, founded in 1954 by a dozen anglers while fishing a local canal.
- Sea Fish Industry Authority – The Sea Fish Industry Authority is a United Kingdom non-departmental public body, established in 1981, and charged with working with the UK seafood industry to promote good quality, sustainable seafood.
- Shark Alliance – The Shark Alliance is a global not-for-profit coalition founded in 2006 of non-governmental organizations dedicated to restoring and conserving shark populations by improving shark conservation policies.
- Sport Fishing and Boating Partnership Council – The Sport Fishing and Boating Partnership Council is an 18-member committee established under the Federal Advisory Committee Act whose purpose is to advise the Secretary of the Interior, through the Director of the U.S.
- Sport Fishing Association – The Sport Fishing Association in Anzoategui is an organized group of people who practice sport fishing in Venezuela.
- Sussex Piscatorial Society – Sussex Piscatorial Society is a unique and historic fishing club with waters in East and West Sussex and surrounding counties.
- Takemefishing.org – Take Me Fishing is a national campaign started by the nonprofit organization Recreational Boating & Fishing Foundation to actively encourage participation in recreational boating and fishing and thereby increase public awareness and appreciation of the need to protect, conserve and restore the natural aquatic resources of American waters.

== Fishing personalities ==
- Sheridan Anderson – Sheridan Andreas Mulholland Anderson was an American outdoorsman, fly fisherman, author, and illustrator.
- Dan Bailey – Dan Bailey was a fly-shop owner, innovative fly developer and staunch Western conservationist.
- Juliana Berners – Juliana Berners, English writer on heraldry, hawking and hunting, is said to have been prioress of Sopwell Nunnery near St Albans.
- Charles Cotton – Charles Cotton was an English poet and writer, best known for translating the work of Michel de Montaigne from the French, for his contributions to The Compleat Angler, and for the highly influential The Compleat Gamester which has been attributed to him.
- Daryl Crimp – Daryl Crimp is a New Zealand writer, illustrator and cartoonist.
- Bill Dance – Bill Dance is an angler and host of Bill Dance Outdoors, a fishing television series on the Versus channel.
- Frank Parker Day – Frank Parker Day was a Canadian athlete, academic and author.
- Michael de Avila – Michael de Avila is an American television personality, filmmaker, and producer from New York, New York.
- John Gierach – John Gierach is an American author and freelance writer who formerly resided on the St.
- Arnold Gingrich – Arnold Gingrich was the editor of, and, along with publisher David A.
- George F. Grant – George F.
- Frederic M. Halford – Frederic Michael Halford, pseudonym Detached Badger, was a wealthy and influential British angler and fly fishing author.
- Charles Hallock – Charles Hallock was an American author born in New York City to Gerard Hallock and Elizabeth Allen.
- Matt Hayes – Matthew 'Matt' Hayes is a British angler
- Charles F. Holder – Charles Frederick Holder was the inventor of big-game fishing and a founder of Pasadena's Tournament of Roses and the Tuna Club of Avalon on Santa Catalina Island.
- Rex Hunt – Rex James Hunt is an Australian television and radio personality, and a former Australian rules football player.
- Billy Lane – Billy Lane was an English angler and author.
- Larry Larsen – Larry Larsen is a United States world-class freshwater sport fishermen and author.
- Norman Maclean – Norman Fitzroy Maclean was an American author and scholar noted for his books A River Runs Through It and Other Stories and Young Men and Fire.
- Roland Martin – Roland Martin is a professional sport fisherman.
- Don Martinez – Donald S.
- Hank Parker – Hank Parker is a well-known professional bass fisherman in the United States.
- James Prosek – James Prosek is an American artist, writer and naturalist.
- Skeet Reese – Skeet Reese is a professional sport fisherman of the B.A.S.S.
- Ernest Schwiebert – Ernest George Schwiebert, Ph.D.
- G. E. M. Skues – George Edward MacKenzie Skues, usually known as G.
- Red Smith – Walter Wellesley "Red" Smith was an American sportswriter who rose to become one of America's most widely read sports columnists.
- Jakub Vágner – Jakub Vágner is a musician, television presenter and extreme angler specializing in travel and natural history.
- Robert Venables – Robert Venables, was a soldier during the English Civil War and noted angler.
- Jeremy Wade – Jeremy John Wade
- Richard Walker – Richard Stuart Walker was an English angler.
- Izaak Walton – Izaak Walton was an English writer.
- John Wilson – John Wilson is a British angler who has been involved with angling television production for the last 20 years featuring on Channel 4 Television and more recently on the digital TV channel, Discovery Real Time.
- Babe Winkelman – Babe Winkelman is a world-renowned Minnesota-based professional fisherman, first coming into the national spotlight with "Babe Winkelman's Good Fishing" television program, which was first syndicated nationwide in the mid-1980s.
- Philip Wylie – Philip Gordon Wylie was a prolific American author on subjects ranging from pulp science fiction, mysteries, social diatribes and satire, to ecology and the threat of nuclear holocaust.
- Chris Yates – Chris Yates is an angler, photographer, broadcaster, tea connoisseur, prolific writer with contributions to the Idler magazine and former Editor of Waterlog magazine. He is a celebrated British fisherman and former record holder with the capture of 51 lb specimen carp from the famous Redmire pool.

=== Fisheries scientists ===
- Fisheries science – Fisheries science is the academic discipline of managing and understanding fisheries.
- J. R. Hartley – J. R. Hartley is both the name of a fictional character and an author's pseudonym inspired by it.

== Fishing television ==
=== Documentaries ===
- Deadliest Catch – Deadliest Catch is a documentary/reality television series produced by Original Productions for the Discovery Channel.
- Lobstermen: Jeopardy at Sea – Lobstermen: Jeopardy at Sea is a multi-part documentary/reality show on the Discovery Channel chronicling the fall 2005 North Atlantic lobster fishing season aboard several fishing boats.
- Lobster Wars – Lobster Wars, also known as Deadliest Catch: Lobstermen in the United Kingdom, is a documentary television series on the Discovery Channel.
- Swords – Swords: Life On the Line is a documentary television series produced by Original Productions for the Discovery Channel.

=== Fishing television series ===
- BassTech – BassTech is an English-language fishing television series that takes the Monster Garage subgenre, and applies it to fishing vessels.
- Beat Charlie Moore – Beat Charlie Moore: is an English-language fishing television series hosted by Charlie Moore that airs on the World Fishing Network.
- Bill Dance Outdoors – Bill Dance Outdoors is a fishing television series hosted by retired professional tournament angler Bill Dance.
- Fishing Australia – Fishing Australia is an Australian fishing television program, produced by WIN Television.
- Fishing with John – Fishing with John is a 1991 television series conceived, directed by and starring actor and musician John Lurie, which earned a cult following.
- Fish Warrior – Fish Warrior is a television series on National Geographic Channel hosted by Jakub Vágner.
- Hook, Line and Sinker – Hook, Line and Sinker is an Australian fishing television program, produced by HLS Productions in Hobart, Tasmania and is hosted by Nick Duigan and Andrew Hart.
- Lunkerville – Lunkerville is a television series dedicated to bass fishing enthusiasts across the U.S.A.
- River Monsters – River Monsters is a documentary television series that airs on Animal Planet, hosted by Jeremy Wade and produced by Icon Films of Bristol, UK.

=== Other ===
- World Fishing Network – World Fishing Network is a Canadian English language Category B specialty channel owned by Insight Sports Ltd.
