= Central New England Fishery Resource Office =

US Fish & Wildlife Service agency

The Central New England Fishery Resource Office is involved in programs to restore, enhance, and manage a number of migratory fish species and the habitats they depend upon. Species of primary concern include American shad, alewife, blueback herring, Atlantic salmon and American eel. Programs include fish population assessments, hatchery product evaluations, habitat restoration, fish trap and transfer, and movement studies.

Staff participate on technical, policy, and assessment committees and related work groups involving fish passage issues, dam removals, restoration planning, and restoration evaluations. Activities are conducted in collaboration with state and federal agencies, watershed groups, fishing clubs, and other non-government organizations. The office conducts assessments and develops management plans for aquatic resources on Service and other federal lands.

== Resources ==
Official Website of Central New England Fishery Resource Office
