= Sussex Piscatorial Society =

Fishing club

SPS Crest, restored in 2008.

Sussex Piscatorial Society (SPS) is a fishing club with waters in East and West Sussex and surrounding counties. SPS was founded in 1891, and separate Coarse and Trout Sections were created in 1923.

Rudyard Kipling, author of The Jungle Book, was a member.

In 2007 SPS won recognition from the Wild Trout Trust for conservation work on their stretch of the River Itchen.
