= Jakub Vágner =

Czech angler (born 1981)

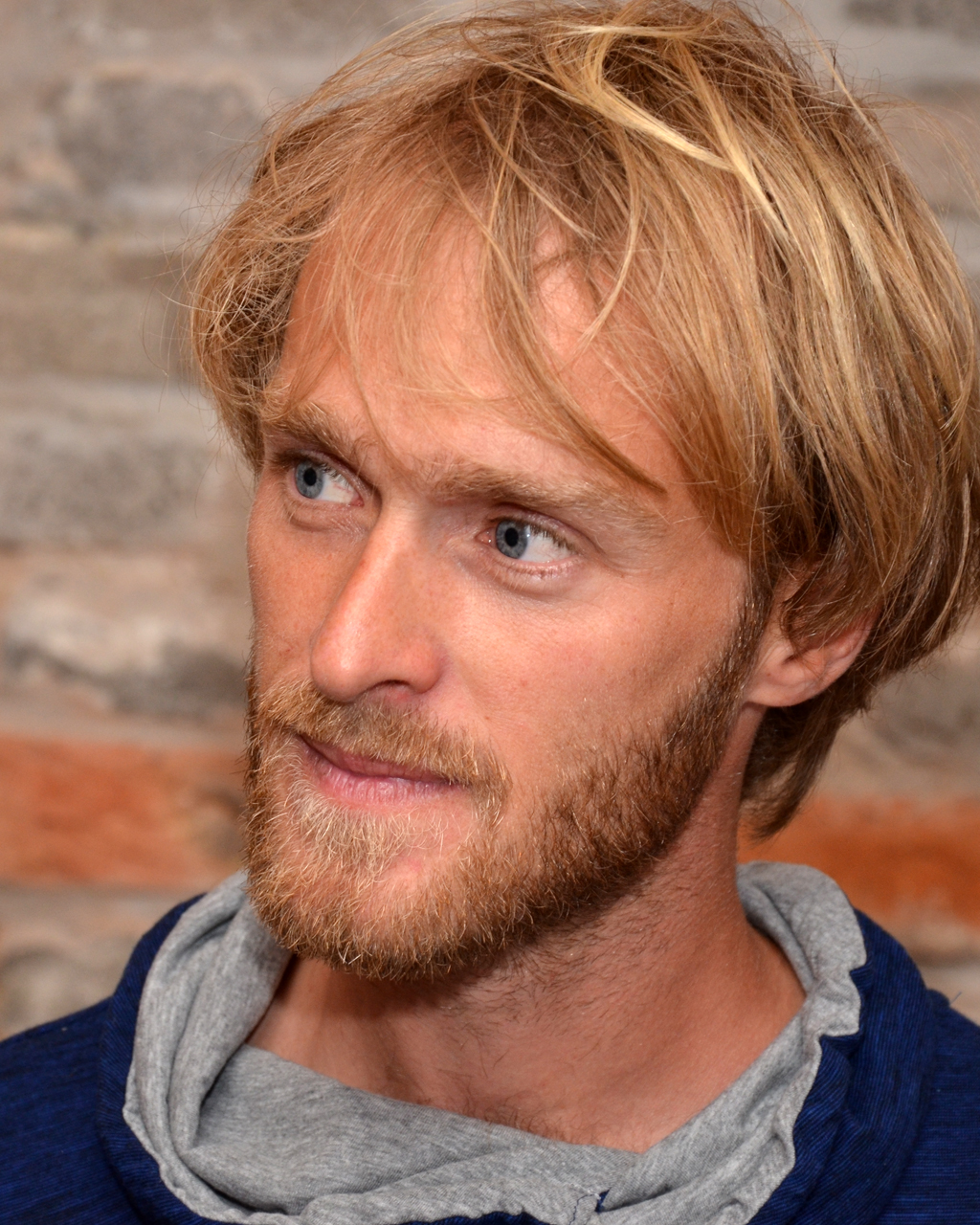
- Born: Jakub Vágner; 24 December 1981 (age 44); Prague, Czechoslovakia (today Czech Republic)
- Occupations: Fisherman, Musician, television presenter, extreme angler
- Website: Homepage

Jakub Vágner (born 24 December 1981, Prague, Czechoslovakia (today Czech Republic)) is a musician, television presenter and extreme angler specializing in travel and natural history. He is best known for his television series Fish Warrior, shown on National Geographic Channel. He holds a special interest in freshwater, and has been travelling around the world fishing for giant freshwater fish.

== Background ==
Jakub Vágner is a lifelong angler and world record-holding fisherman. Vágner embarks on extreme fishing expeditions to the most remote regions of the world in search of some of the largest and rarest fish.

== See also ==
- Jeremy Wade
