= BassTech =

American television series

BassTech is an English-language fishing television series that takes the Monster Garage subgenre, and applies it to fishing vessels. Ordinary bass boats are turned into the extraordinary.

This Pimp My Bass series airs on the World Fishing Network, and premiered fall 2006.
