= Fish Warrior =

- Starring: Jakub Vágner
- Country of origin: United States
- No. of seasons: 2
- No. of episodes: 6

Production
- Running time: 60 minutes
- Production company: Hoff Productions

Original release
- Network: National Geographic Channel
- Release: July 26, 2010 – March 25, 2011

Fish Warrior is a television series on National Geographic Channel hosted by Jakub Vágner. The first season aired in July 2010, with the second season following in March 2011. Jakub Vágner is a lifelong angler and world record-holding fisherman who embarks on extreme fishing expeditions to the most remote regions of the world.

== Episodes ==
=== Season 1 (2010) ===
No. overall	No. in season	Title	Original release date
1	1	"Amazon Giant"	July 26, 2010
2	2	"Colossal Catfish"	August 2, 2010
3	3	"Nile Mammoth"	August 9, 2010

=== Season 2 (2011) ===
No. overall	No. in season	Title	Original release date
4	1	"Catfish Attack"	March 11, 2011
5	2	"Living Dinosaur"	March 18, 2011
6	3	"Texas Titan"	March 25, 2011

== See also ==
- River Monsters
