= Sniggle =

Type of fish hook used for catching eels

Sniggling apparatus

A sniggle is a type of fish hook used for catching eels (known as snigs), using the method of sniggling. A typical method of sniggling is to tie a fishing line to the middle of a large needle or fish hook. The needle is then inserted along the body of an earthworm which is used as bait. The needle is then stuck into a slender sniggling pole such as a hazel wand, eight to ten feet long. This is used to insert the bait into promising holes or crannies in which eels tend to lurk. When an eel takes the bait then, after a minute or two, the bait will have been swallowed whole and the line is then pulled to rotate the needle or hook within the body of the eel so snagging and catching it. Eels of two or three pounds weight may be caught by this method but may require a protracted tug of war to pull them from their hole. This provides better sport and amusement than the use of traps or clod-fishing and is a good alternative for the angler when game fish such as trout will not rise.
