= Minor Tactics of the Chalk Stream =

1910 book by G.E.M. Skues

Minor Tactics of the Chalk Stream and Kindred Studies
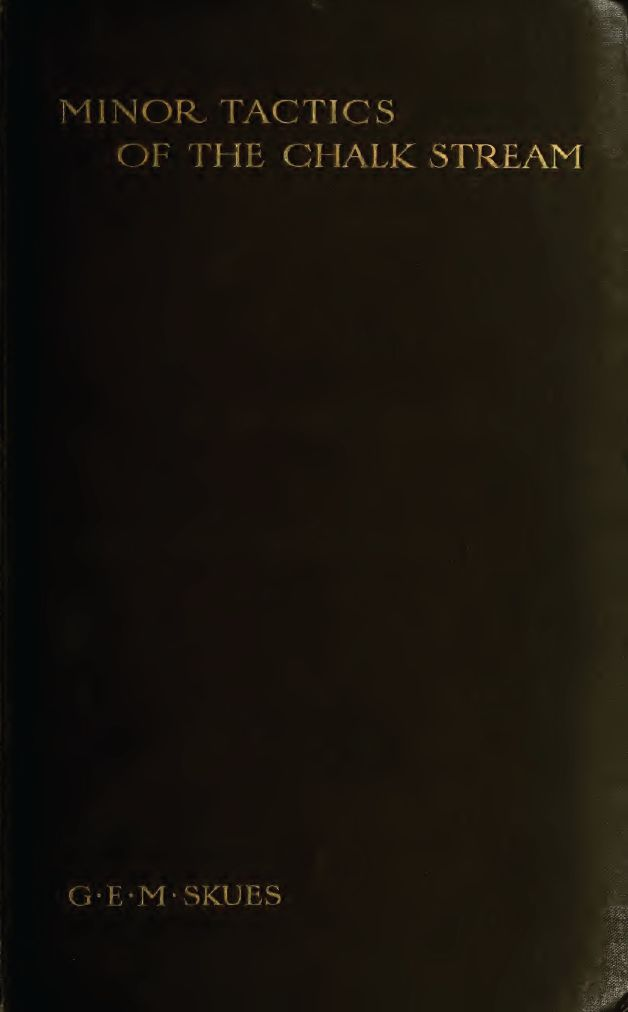
- Original cover
- Author: G. E. M. Skues
- Language: English
- Subject: Fly fishing
- Publisher: Adams and Charles Black, London
- Publication date: 1910
- Publication place: England
- Pages: 133
- Followed by: The Way of a Trout with the Fly (1921)

Minor Tactics of the Chalk Stream and Kindred Studies is a fly fishing book written by G. E. M. Skues published in London in 1910. Minor Tactics was Skues's first book and set the stage for his ascendancy as the inventor of nymph fishing for trout.

== Synopsis ==
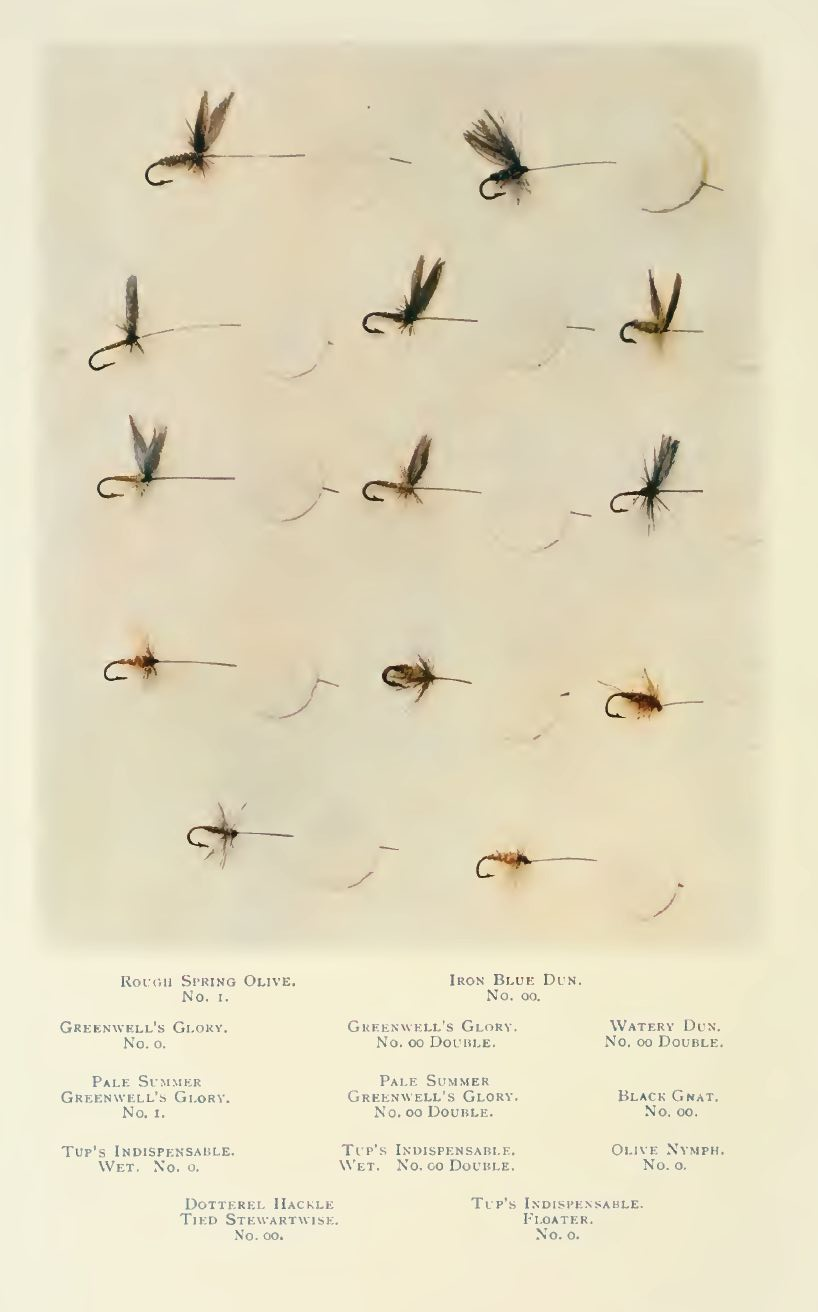
Frontispiece from Minor Tactics depicting 13 of Skues's favorite flies

Although Minor Tactics begins in the foreword with thanks and appreciation to F. M. Halford for his Dry-Fly Fishing in Theory and Practice published in 1889 as the last word on chalk stream fishing for trout, the book marks Skues's long campaign to restore the wet fly to its rightful place on the chalk streams of England from which the wet fly had been banished during the dogmatic dry fly period of the last 19th century.

From the Foreword:

Rising from the perusal of "Dry-Fly Fishing in Theory and Practice" on its publication by F. M. Halford in 1889, I think I was at one with most anglers of the day in feeling that the last word had been written on the art of chalk-stream fishing—so sane, so clear, so comprehensive, is it; so just and so in accord with one's own experience. Twenty years have gone by since then without my having had either occasion or inclination to go back at all upon this view of that, the greatest work, in my opinion, which has ever seen the light on the subject of angling for trout and grayling; and it is still, as regards that side of the subject with which it deals, all that I then believed it. But one result of the triumph of the dry fly, of which that work was the crown and consummation, was the obliteration from the minds of men, in much less than a generation, of all the wet-fly lore which had served many generations of chalk stream anglers well. The effect was stunning, hypnotic, submerging; and in these days, if one excepts a few eccentrics who have been nurtured on the wet fly on other waters, and have little experience of chalk streams, one would find few with any notion that anything but the dry fly could be effectively used upon Hampshire rivers, or that the wet fly was ever used there. I was for years myself under the spell, and it is the purpose of the ensuing pages to tell, for the benefit of the angling community, by what processes, by what stages, I have been led into a sustained effort to recover for this generation, and to transmute into forms suited to the modern conditions of sport on the chalk stream, the old wet-fly art, to be used as a supplement to, and in no sense to supplant or rival, the beautiful art of which Mr. F. M. Halford is the prophet. How far my effort has been successful I must leave my readers to judge. I myself feel that in making it I have widened my angling horizon, and that I have added enormously to the interest and charm of my angling days as well as to my chances of success, and that, too, by the use of no methods which the most rigid purist could rightly condemn, but by a difficult, delicate, fascinating, and entirely legitimate form of the art, well worthy of the naturalist sportsman.

In the course of my too rare excursions to the river-side, I have elaborated some devices, methods of attack and handling, which I have found of service, some applicable to wet-fly, some to dry-fly fishing, or to both. In the hope that these may be of interest or service, I have included papers upon them.

== Reviews ==
In A History of Fly Fishing for Trout (1921), John Waller Hills wrote:

But there is another [tendency], and that is the revival of the sunk fly, even on ground from which it was believed to have been banished for ever. This revival is due largely to the writings of Mr. G. E. M. Skues, whose Minor Tactics of the Chalk Stream was published in 1910. In this book he proves conclusively that the sunk fly has its use on the shyest chalk stream, that it will kill when the dry fly will not, and that it is a form of fishing as difficult and as entrancing as the other. It is an original book, and it is no disparagement to its originality to say that it is founded on the wisdom of our ancestors. Mr. Skues is indebted to Stewart both for his method of fishing and of tying flies, a debt which he amply acknowledges. His great merit is that he has revived and brought up to date for use on chalk streams what was a lost art. He has rediscovered and restated it in terms suited to to-day. His book gives fishing a new starting point, and opens a new chapter in its history.

In Notable Angling Literature (1945) James Robb said of Skues and Minor Tactics

One of the subtlest writers on fishing with fly in any form is G.E.M. Skues, the author of Nymph Fishing. His book Minor Tactics of the Chalk Stream, put an end to the dry-fly purist and brought the angling world back to sanity.

In A Summer on the Test (1930) by John Waller Hill as quoted by Arnold Gingrich in The Fishing in Print (1974) Hills wrote:

When, exactly twenty years ago, Mr. Skues wrote Minor Tactics of the Chalk Stream, he effected a revolution. The dry fly was a height of its intolerant dictatorship, and the other method was discarded and ridiculed to such an extent that enthusiasts of the school of Halford regarded Mr. Skues as a dangerous heresiarch... More and more each year does nymph fishing become part of the modern angler's equipment, and he who does not possess the art is gravely handicapped....Flies got smaller and smaller, but it was not until Mr. G.E.M. Skues produced Minor Tactics of the Chalk Stream in 1910 that underwater fishing was again systematised...Hense comes the modern school of nymph fishing

In Skues on Trout (2008) Paul Schullery notes:

Skues's first book, Minor Tactics of the Chalk Stream (1910), tentatively rebelled against the exclusivity with which dry-fly advocates perceived themselves as the highest and most refined form of anglers

== Other Editions ==
- Skues, G. E. M. (1914). Minor Tactics of the Chalk Stream and Kindred Studies (2nd ed.). London: A & C Black.
- Skues, G. E. M. (1924). Minor Tactics of the Chalk Stream and Kindred Studies (3rd ed.). London: A & C Black.
- Skues, G. E. M. (1950). Minor Tactics of the Chalk Stream and Kindred Studies (3rd Edition Reprint ed.). London: A & C Black.
- Skues, G. E. M. (1974). Minor Tactics of the Chalk Stream and Kindred Studies (1st Edition Reprint ed.). London: Adams and Charles Black. ISBN 0-7136-1447-1.
- Skues, G. E. M. (1995). Minor Tactics of the Chalk Stream and Kindred Studies (Flyfisher's Classic Library 1910 Facsimile ed.). Wales, UK: Bovey Tracy.
- Skues, G. E. M. (1996). Minor Tactics of the Chalk Stream and Kindred Studies (Collectors ed.). Norwalk CT: Easton Press.

== See also ==
Bibliography of fly fishing
