= Partridge and Orange =

Artificial fly fishing lure

- Artificial fly
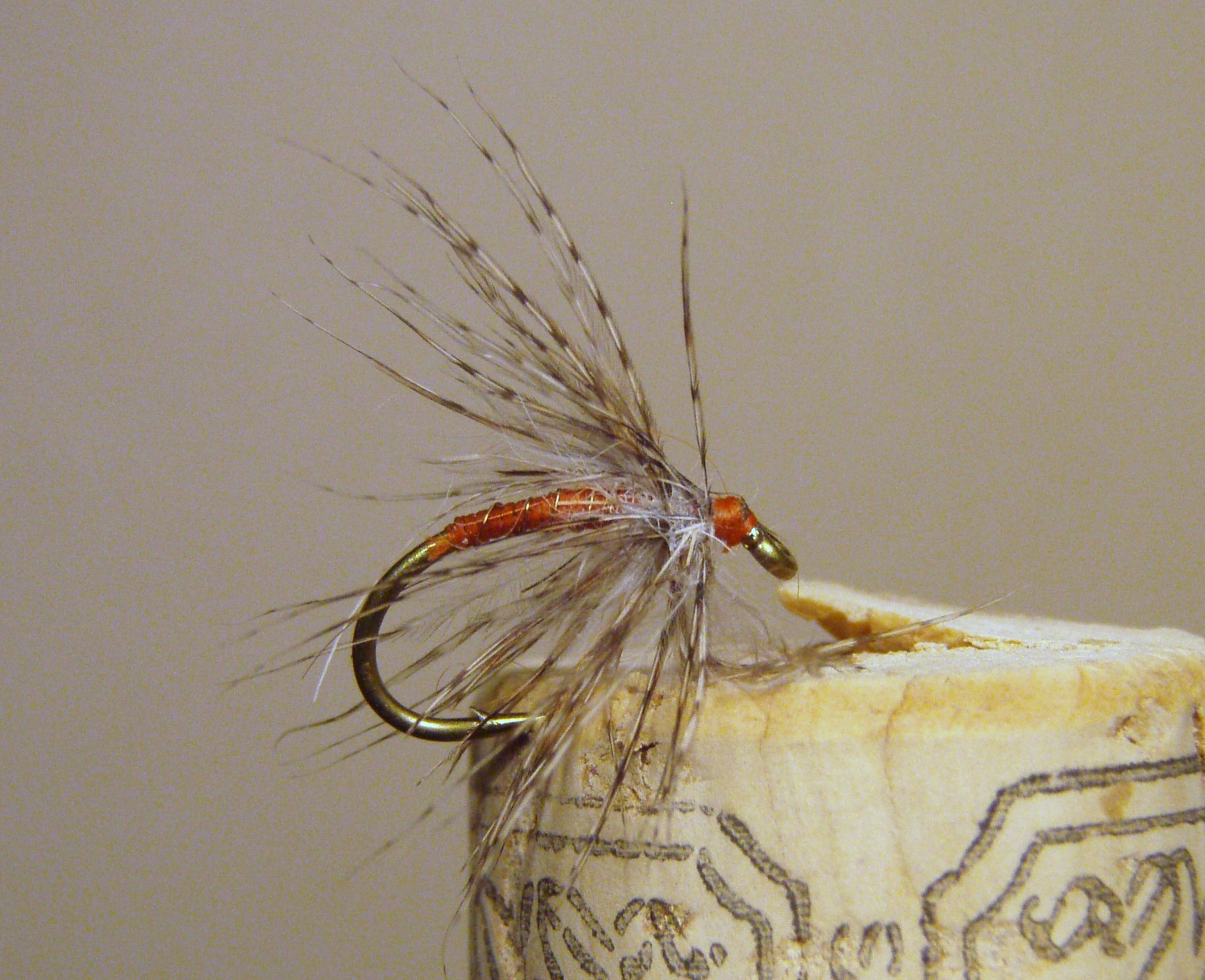
- Type: Wet fly, soft hackle
- Imitates: Emerging caddis or mayfly

History
- Creator: Unknown, described by T.E. Pritt (1895)
- Created: 19th century
- Other names: Spiders

Materials
- Typical sizes: 12–18
- Typical hooks: TMC 206BL, Daiichi 1130, Mustad C49S
- Thread: Persall's Gossamer Silk, 6/0–8/0 nylon, Orange
- Tail: None
- Body: Thread
- Ribbing: Fine gold wire (optional)
- Hackle: English or Hungarian partridge neck
- Thorax: Tan rabbit fur

Uses
- Primary use: Trout, grayling
- Other uses: Panfish

Reference(s)
- Pattern references: Trout Flies-The Tier's Reference (1999), Hughes

The Partridge and Orange is an artificial fly commonly categorized as a wet fly or soft hackle and is fished under the water surface. The fly is a very well known fly with its roots set firmly in English angling history. It is an impressionistic pattern fished successfully during caddis hatches and spinner falls. The Partridge and Orange is traditionally a trout and grayling pattern but may be used for other aquatic insect feeding species.

== Origin ==
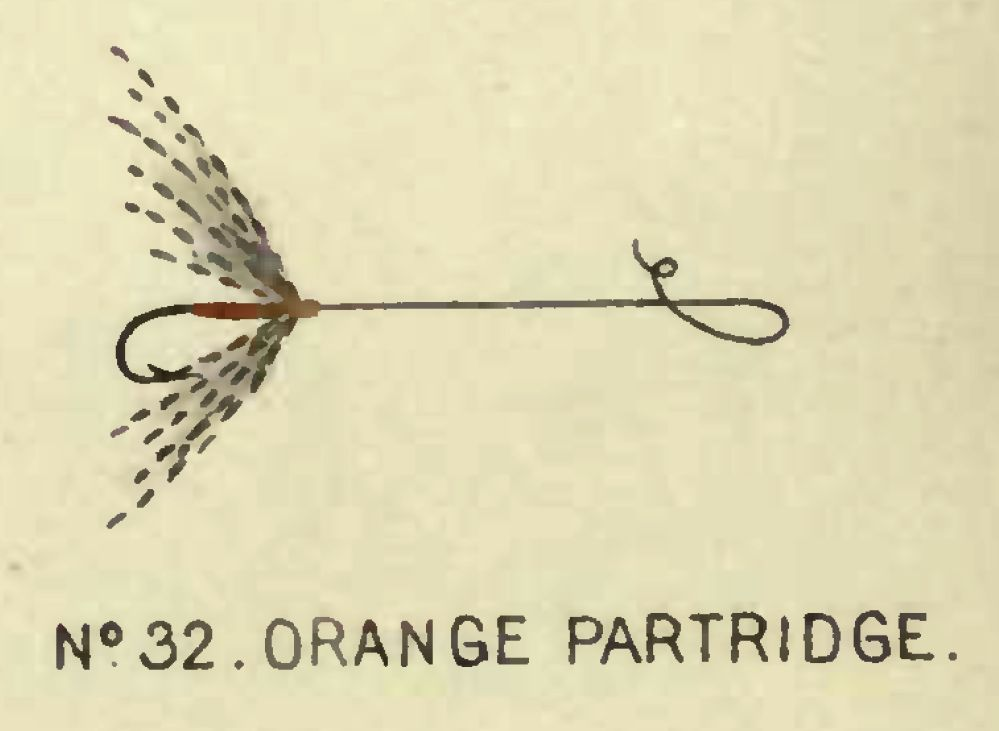
Pritt's Orange Partridge (1885)

Soft-hackled flies as they are known today and in particular The Partridge and Orange originated in the north country of England and were first described by Joseph Wells in his 1842 publication THE CONTEMPLATIVE ANGLER. Later, T. E. Pritt's Yorkshire Trout Flies (1895) publication built upon Wells' earlier work and contained many of Wells' listed patterns, and were probably from the same source.

No. 32. ORANGE PARTRIDGE. Hook 1. WINGS. Hackled as in No. 31. BODY. Orange silk. These are practically the same flies, and are very excellent killers. I prefer the dressing of No. 32 myself, although one will kill as well as the other, and the angler may look upon one of them as indispensable on his cast from April to September, on warm days. It is the Turkey Brown of Ronalds, and the Spiral Brown Drake of Theakston.

Sylvester Nemes in The Soft-hackled Fly popularized this style of artificial fly in the early 1980s while giving credit to Pritt and many others for the evolution of this genera of pattern which had also been known as spiders.

== Imitates ==
The Partridge and Orange resembles emerging caddis pupa, diving adult caddis or sunken may fly spinners

== Pattern ==
- Hook: 12 – 18 medium/light wet fly or caddis pupa
- Thread: Orange 6/0 or 8/0
- Body: Formed with tying thread
- Rib: Fine gold wire (optional)
- Hackle: Mottled brown partridge

== Variations and sizes ==
The Partridge and Orange is typically tied on standard wet fly and nymph hooks unweighted but may be tied on short caddis pupa hooks. Some tiers tie a bead head version. The gold ribbing may be omitted or replaced with a thread ribbing. There are similar versions of this fly known as the Partridge and Yellow and the Partridge and Green. Many tiers include a small section of fur dubbing for a thorax. Soft-hackle nymphs based on the Partridge and Orange design are tied with a wide variety of quill, feather and dubbed bodies.

== Gallery ==
Images of soft-hackle nymphs
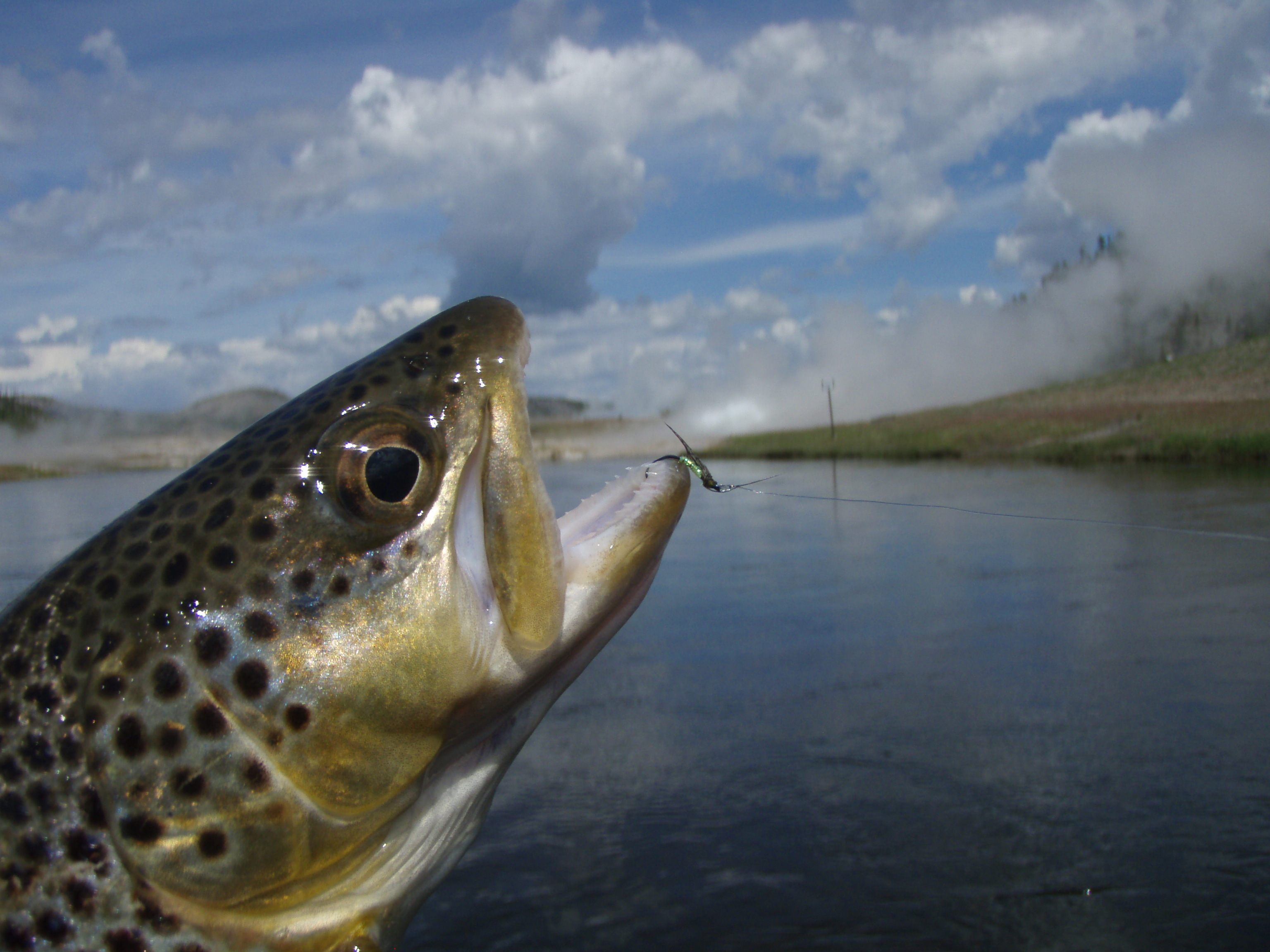
Brown trout with soft-hackle fly

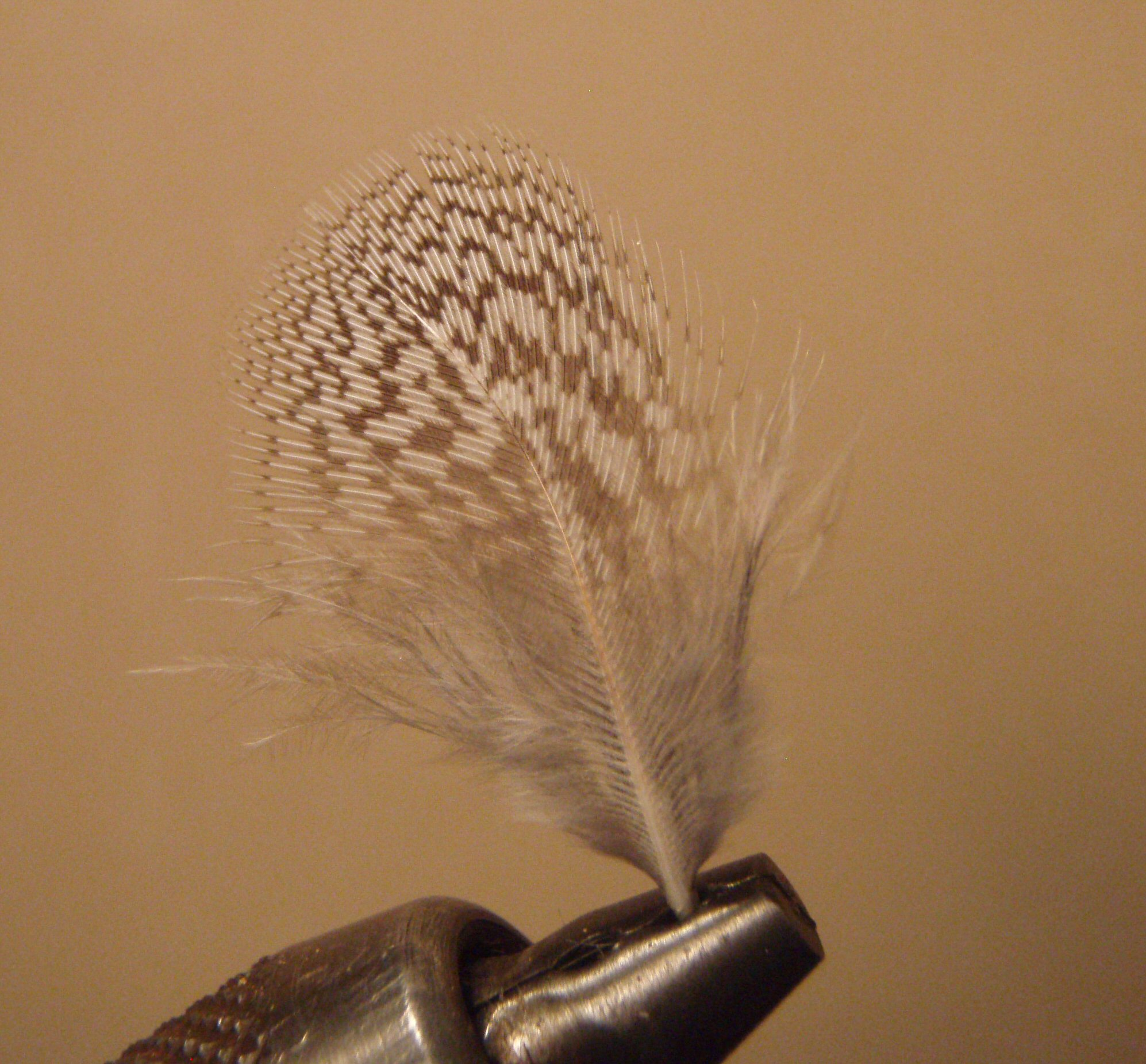
Typical partridge feather used for soft-hackle flies

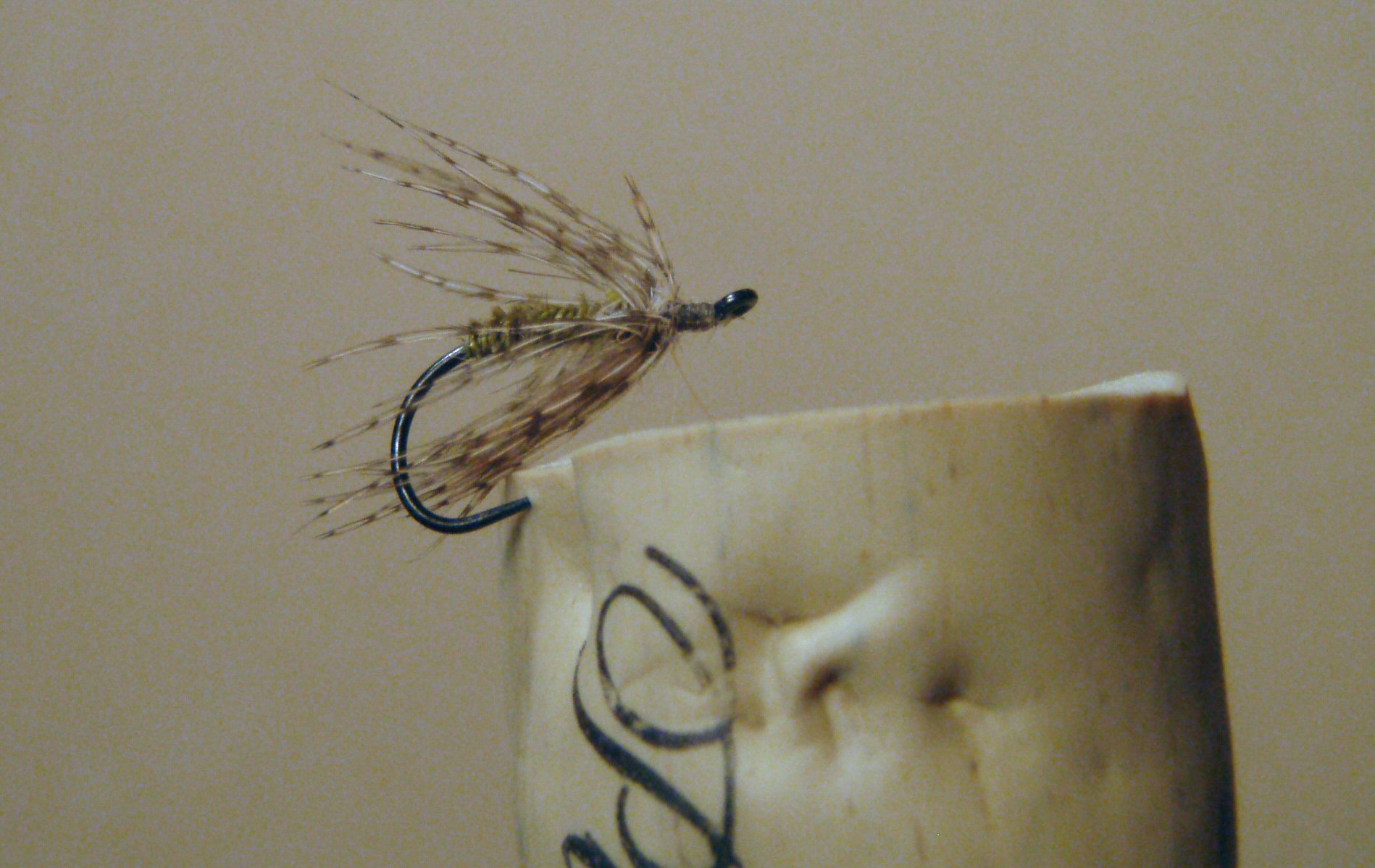
Partridge and Olive, Olive Goose Quill fiber body

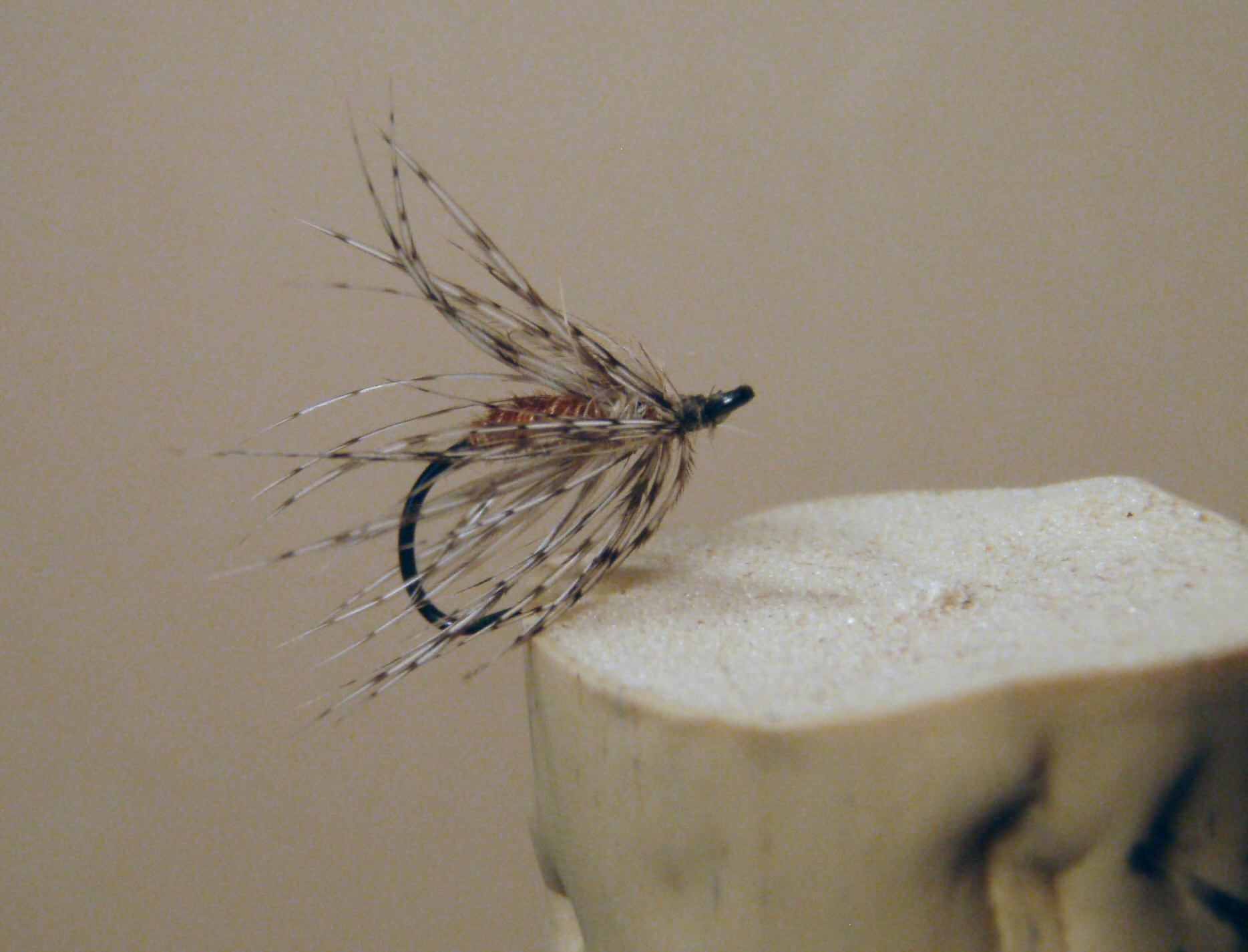
Partridge and Pheasant, Pheasant Tail fiber body

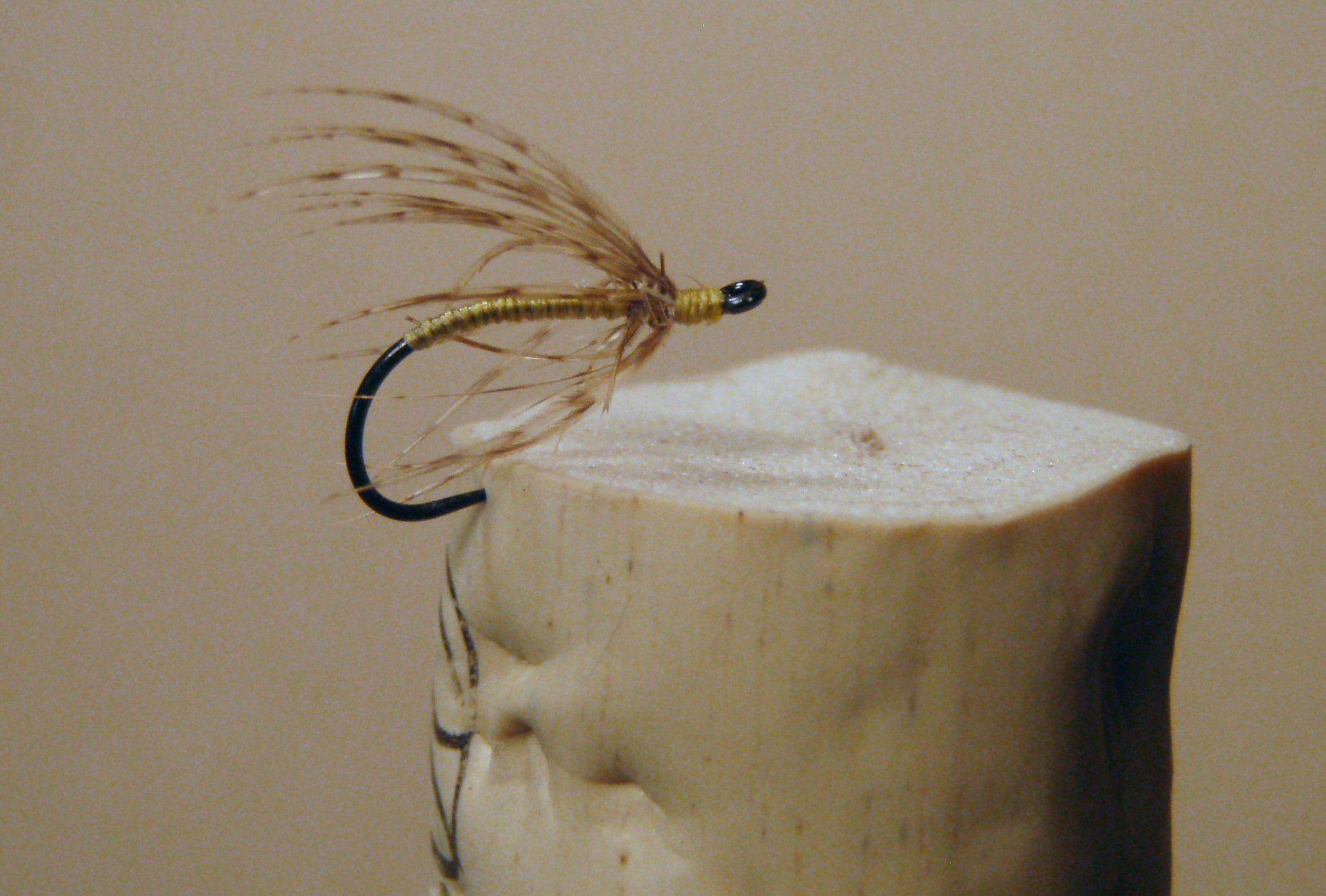
Partridge and Yellow, Yellow silk body

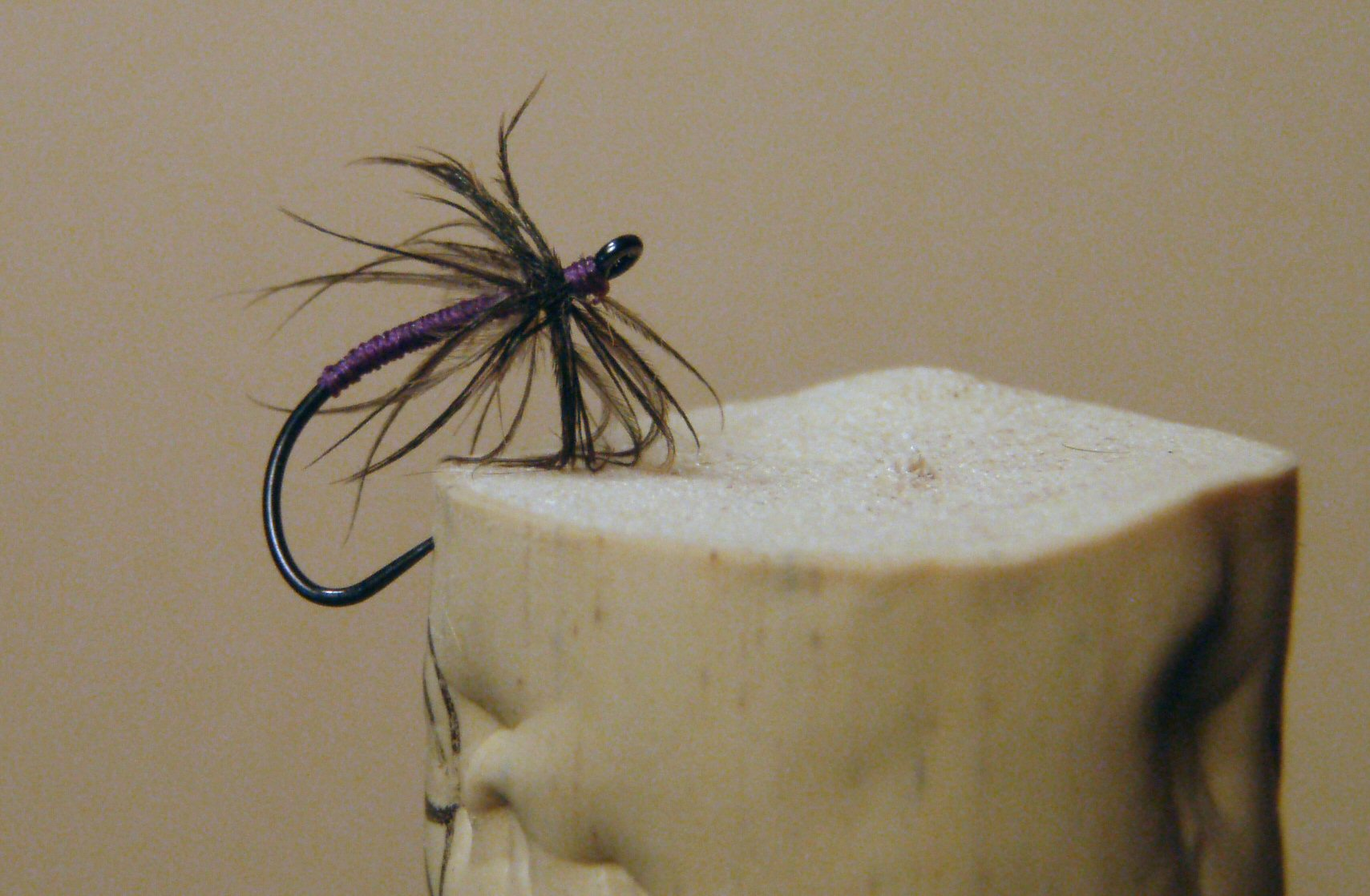
Starling and Purple, Purple silk body, Starling hackle
