= Fly rod building =

Art of constructing a fly fishing rod

Fly rod building is the art of constructing a fly fishing rod to match the performance desires of the individual angler. Fly rods are usually made of graphite or cane poles. There are several commercial manufacturers of fly rods, including well known industry brands such as Echo, G. Loomis, Hardy, Orvis, Redington, R.L. Winston, Sage, Scott, St. Croix, Temple Fork Outfitters, and Thomas & Thomas. However, many individuals make fly rods for personal pleasure or profit.

== Construction and assembly ==
=== Rod blank ===
Construction of a fly rod starts with the rod blank. The blank is a pole, typically graphite, that forms the core of the rod. Rod blanks are purchased from any one of a number of suppliers. Selection of the appropriate rod blank consists of choosing the weight, length, number of sections and action.

unfinished rod and winding tool

Rod blanks can be purchased with guide locations preset for the individual rod or placed by hand. Rod sections tend to be directional, wanting to flex in a certain direction over others. Rod builders usually test each rod section to find the point of greatest flex (a.k.a. spinning the rod) so that guides can be aligned along it. With the placement around the rod determined, the rod builder next determines where along the length of the rod to place the guides. This is usually done by taping the guides onto the rod, stringing the rod, flexing it and moving each guide to achieve the best fit to the rod's natural flex.

Guides have 'feet' or extensions that lie flat against the rod surface. The feet are secured to the rod by wrapping them with nylon or silk thread. Once all the guides are secured, they are coated with a slow-cure epoxy. The rod is constantly turned during the curing process so that the epoxy cures in a uniform manner with no bulges or sags.

=== Handle ===
Once the rod blank is chosen the handle is attached. Most handles are made of cork. Each handle consists of a series of cork rings glued together and turned in a lathe. Handles can be purchased complete or the rod builder may purchase cork rings and build the handle. The handles must be hollowed out to match the taper of the rod so that they fit snugly. They are then glued into place. Many times the handle is finished off with a 'winding check' being glued in place. The winding check is an aluminium or rubber ring that is the diameter of the rod where the pole side of the handle meets the pole. The winding check protects the cork from chipping where it meets the rod and also provides a finish to the look of the rod.

With handle attached to the rod, the guides can be placed. The number of guides varies according to the designer and the length of the rod. Most rods have one more guide than the number of feet of rod length, not including the top guide. Guides must be placed carefully on the rod so as to get the best action out of the graphite. The builder must first locate the spine on each section. The guides then will be attached along the spine, or more often along a line opposite it. Guides come in many different grades and materials with the objective of providing the best combination of flex with the rod, hardness to reduce wear from the line action, and polish to make the line slip through the guide easily.

=== Reel seat ===
Finally the reel seat is attached to the butt end of the rod. Reel seats are typically made of aluminium or nickel-silver alloy. They come as an assembled unit or as a skeleton. A skeleton is a set of metal components that fit onto a wood or graphite core and are assembled into a complete reel seat. The advantage of the skeleton is that the designer can make or choose an insert of their choosing. Inserts are sold from a variety of materials from simple inexpensive woods to exotic hardwoods. The reel seat usually has an inside diameter significantly larger than the outside diameter of the rod blank butt forcing the rod builder to build up the butt to match the reel seat. This is usually done by simply creating rings of masking tape around the rod blank butt. The reel seat is then slipped onto the blank butt and epoxied into place.

Additionally, many fly rod builders adorn their own hand constructed fly rods with unique decorative thread wrappings and other distinguishing characteristics.
