= The Way of a Trout with the Fly =

1921 fly fishing book by G. E. M. Skues

The Way of a Trout with a Fly and Some Further Studies in Minor Tactics is a fly fishing book written by G. E. M. Skues published in London in 1921. This was Skues's second book after Minor Tactics of the Chalk Stream (1910).

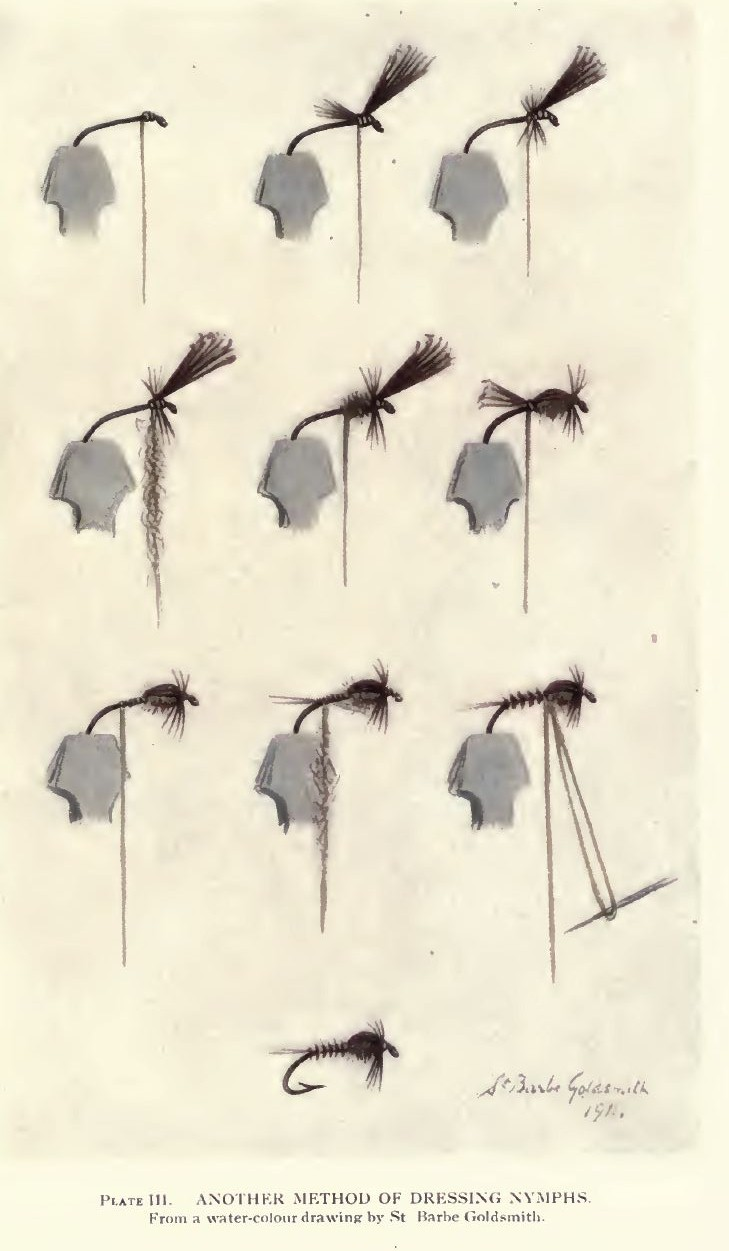
Plate III - Another Method of Dressing Nymphs

== Synopsis ==
The Way of a Trout was originally intended to be a treatise on the theory and practice of dressing trout flies but, by Skues's own admission, does not do a very good job of it. The book does include a number of original and interesting chapters on fly dressing and Skues's theories on the vision of trout. Additionally, the Minor Tactics section expands on Skues's exploration of nymph fishing for trout.

== Reviews ==
- In Notable Angling Literature (1945) James Robb said of Skues and The Way of a Trout:

He pursued the matter [Nymph fishing] with his striking books The Way of a Trout with the Fly and Nymph Fishing for Chalk Stream Trout. Mr. Skues is a useful antedote to the extremists who followed Halford and should be read along with that author. To Mr. G. E. M. Skues anglers are indebted among other things for his particular method of tying as well as for his imitations of nymphs; they are given in his Minor Tactics of the Chalk Stream and The Way of a Trout with the Fly.

- In The Well-Tempered Angler (1965) Arnold Gingrich listed The Way of a Trout as one of the top 30 literary and technical books on fly fishing since the publication of the Treatyse of Fysshynge Wyth an Angle (1496)
- Dr. Andrew Herd, noted British fly-fishing historian, characterizes The Way of The Trout:

This is a classic and I often wonder if Skues knew it would be when he set pen to paper. The book is inspirational in a way that Halford's work never was and grips the reader's attention right from the cover, which in the first edition bears the words: ....

The Way of a Trout shows Skues at the height of his powers and it contains the best of his thinking on fishing nymphs and semi-submerged patterns, illustrated by the sort of asides, stories and vast fund of experience that only he could call upon.

- In Skues on Trout (2008) Paul Schullery notes:

His second book, which many still regard as a masterpiece, was The Way of a Trout with the Fly (1921), and it quickly established him as one of the day's great angling theorists--as it also established the intellectual and ethical basis for sunken flies as legitimate tools of a well-rounded angler.

== Contents ==
- Foreword - ix
- Division I
- Part I
  - I. Considerations Of Motive - 1
  - II. The Why - 3
  - III. Freewill and Predestination - 5
- Part II
  - I. The Sense Of Taste - 8
  - II. The Sense Of Smell - 9
- Part III - The Vision Of Trout
  - I. A Preliminary Cast - 10
  - II. The Sense of Form And Definition - 13
  - III. The Invisibility of Hooks - 17
  - IV. The Sense of Position - 18
  - V. A Problem for The Optician - 20
  - VI. The Sense of Number - 23
  - VII. The Sense of Colour - 24
  - VIII. The Sense of Size - 31
  - IX. Tone - 32
  - X. In Dusk and Dark - 34
  - XI. Looking Upward - 36
  - XII. Looking Upward In Dusk and Dark - 43
- Part IV - How
  - I. The Mouth of A Trout - 48
  - II. A Speculation in Bubbles - 50
  - III. The Rise - 51
  - IV. Assorted Rises - 59
  - V. Fausse Montee - 65
  - VI. The Moment - 67
- Part V - What
  - I. Flies as Food - 69
  - II. Fly Dressing as An Art - 75
  - III. Imitation, Representation, Suggestion - 77
  - IV. Styles of Fly Dressing - 79
  - V. Kick - 82
  - VI. Ex Mortua Manu - 83
- Part VI – Bafflement - 89
- Division II - Some Further Minor Tactical Studies
  - I. Some Problems - 90
    - The Hare's-Ear Puzzle - 90
    - Upstream Wind - 91
    - A Curious Contrast - 96
    - The Red Quill - 100
    - The Entrance Out - 102
    - The Alder and Canon K. - 104
    - The Willow-Fly - 107
  - II. Some Fly-Dressing Examples - 108
    - Iron Blue - 108
    - A Good Small Olive - 109
    - July Dun - 110
    - Little Red Sedge - 113
    - Pheasant Tail - 115
    - Rusty Spinner - 117
    - The Pope and the Tailers - 118
  - III. Some More Fly Dressing—Principles and Practice - 121
    - Theories of Wet-Fly Dressing of Trout Flies - 121
    - The Dressing of Nymphs - 125
    - The Purposes of a Hackle - 129
    - The Spade Feather - 132
    - Buzz - 133
    - A Good Entry - 134
    - Quality in Fly-Dressing Materials - 135
  - IV. Sundry Observations - 138
    - What Made the Dry Fly Possible - 138
    - The Excommunication of the Wet Fly - 139
    - The Cultivation of Shyness - 149
    - Semi-Submerged, Etc. - 154
    - Wind and the Evening Rise - 157
    - On the Accuracy of Authorities - 161
    - Driftweed and Bad Advice - 162
  - V. B.W.O. - 166
    - B.W.O. - 166
  - VI. Tactical - 172
    - Glimpses of the Moon - 172
    - Side Strain - 176
    - Of Pocket Picking - 180
    - Of the Ways of Brer Fox - 181
    - Picking It off: A Very Minor Tactic - 183
    - Argillaceous - 184
    - Of Glycerine - 186
    - The Switch - 188
  - VII. Psychological - 192
    - Hands - 192
    - Accuracy and Delicacy - I94
    - The Triumph of the Inadequate - 196
  - VIII. Frankly Immoral - 201
    - Makeshift - 201
  - IX. Episodical - 205
    - Established Principles and Trout - 205
    - An Abnormal Day - 208
    - One of Life's Little Cast Ironies - 210
    - Another of Life's Little Cast Ironies - 212
    - A Borrowed Rod - 213
    - A Local Fall - 217
    - At the Second Culvert - 219
    - Bobbing Reed - 224
    - Sporting Hazards on a Berkshire Brook - 226
    - Four - 232
    - Nine to One - 237
    - A Travelling Companion - 242
    - The Following Day - 246
    - My Sticking-Plaster Trout - 252
  - X. Doggerel from the Club Journal - 255
    - Little Brown Wink - 255
    - A Sequel - 257
  - Advertisement—Amadou - 260
- ILLUSTRATIONS
  - I. THE BLUE DUN AS RENDERED IN DIFFERENT SYSTEMS - Frontispiece
  - II. Method of Dressing Nymphs - 124
  - III. Another Method of Dressing Nymphs - 128

== Subsequent editions ==
- Skues, G. E. M. (1928). The Way of a Trout with the Fly (2nd ed.). London: A & C Black.
- Skues, G. E. M. (1935). The Way of a Trout with the Fly (3rd ed.). London: A & C Black.
- Skues, G. E. M. (1949). The Way of a Trout with the Fly (4th ed.). London: A & C Black.
- Skues, G. E. M. (1955). The Way of a Trout with the Fly (4th Edition 2nd Printing ed.). London: A & C Black.
- Skues, G. E. M. (1961). The Way of a Trout with the Fly (4th Edition-Revised ed.). London: A & C Black. ISBN 1-4995-0836-0.
- Skues, G. E. M. (1973). The Way of a Trout with the Fly (4th Edition-Reprint ed.). London: A & C Black. ISBN 0-7136-0712-2.
- Skues, G. E. M. (1993). The Way of a Trout with the Fly (Flyfisher's Classic Library 1921 Facsimile ed.). Wales, UK: Bovey Tracy.
- Skues, G. E. M. (1996). The Way of a Trout with the Fly (Collectors ed.). Norwalk CT: Easton Press.

== See also ==
Bibliography of fly fishing
