= Sheridan Anderson =

American outdoorsman, fly fisherman, author, and illustrator

- Born: Sheridan Andreas Mulholland Anderson; September 18, 1936; Los Angeles, California, U.S.
- Died: March 31, 1984 (aged 47); Las Vegas, Nevada, U.S.
- Other names: E. Lovejoy Wolfinger III
- Occupations: Cartoonist; Fly fisherman; Outdoorsman; Illustrator; Author; Sign painter
- Notable work: Curtis Creek Manifesto

Sheridan Andreas Mulholland Anderson (18 September 1936 — 31 March 1984) was an American cartoonist, fly fisherman, outdoorsman, illustrator, author, and sign painter.

He is primarily known for being the author of the cult classic Curtis Creek Manifesto, a 48-page illustrated guide to fly fishing that has sold close to one million copies and has been reprinted over 20 times since its first publication in 1978.

== Biography ==
=== Early life ===
Anderson was born on September 18, 1936, in Los Angeles. His father, first enrolled in the Army, then a car salesman, moved the family to Salt Lake City where Anderson spent most of his early life drawing and painting.

His uncle-in-law Grant was the only angler among his relatives and the one that taught him fly fishing on the rivers of West Yellowstone and Montana.

While Anderson studied art at the University of Utah, he dropped out after two semesters, never completing his studies. Afterwards he attended some college courses around the Western United States, spending most of his 20s wandering from place to place.

=== 60s and 70s at Camp 4 ===
In his vagabonding Anderson eventually met climbers that led him to Camp 4, a campground in Yosemite National Park that was the epicenter of the American rock climbing scene during the 60s. Camp 4 attracted pioneers such as Chuck Pratt, Steve Roper, Yvon Chouinard and Royal Robbins, whom Anderson befriended. He was especially close to Chouinard, Patagonia's founder, whom he used to fish with. While not as skilled a climber, Anderson partook in at least two first ascents: Andy’s Inferno in 1964, and Aunt Fanny’s Pantry in 1965.

Anderson spent nearly two decades embedded in Camp 4's climbing community, taking on the role of unofficial artist-in-residence and gaining a reputation for using his satirical cartoons to poke fun at any climbing star who dared to take themselves too seriously. During this time he also applied his artistry beyond the campground, illustrating how-to climbing books Basic Rockcraft and Advanced Rockcraft written by Royal Robbins, as well as contributing words and cartoons to climbing magazines such as Summit (America’s first monthly climbing magazine), Ascent, Mountain, and Mountain Gazette. During this time, trying not to be recognized by the publishers of Summit, he took on the pen name of "E. Lovejoy Wolfinger III" so that he could contribute to the short-lived, off-color, climbing zine Vulgarian Digest.

When he wasn't spending summers in Yosemite, Anderson wintered in places like Reno, Bishop, and, mostly, San Francisco, where he sometimes made ends meet as a sign painter and regularly haunted the Golden Gate casting ponds and local fly shops.

While the details of the accident remained contested, (Note: Joe Kelsey reported that "He was always kind of vague about it but, from what he told me, he fell off a trail hiking in the Sierras." while Frank Amato, his publisher, said that he had fallen off a billboard he was painting. Dick Dumais, a fellow rock climber, believed he was on the receiving end of a falling rock. A magazine bio wrote that "[Anderson was] scrambling unroped on his way to a rather informal climbing school run by Warren Harding.") a vertebra fracture in 1971 forced Anderson to stop climbing completely.

=== Writing Curtis Creek Manifesto ===
The idea for Curtis Creek Manifesto began to form at Camp 4, where Anderson had to "[supply] a half-dozen fellow pirates with fresh trout" and reported being encouraged to monetize his talents—fishing and drawing—so as to live his bohemian lifestyle more comfortably.

Anderson wanted to co-write the book with his uncle Grant, the master angler that taught him how to fly fish, but Grant turned him down saying the book was "his baby" and encouraged him to continue pursuing it alone. Grant is credited in the "Acknowledgements and Thanks" section of the final book as the "best fly fisherman [Anderson] ever knew" and thanked for "his genius" without which the book "would have never been possible."

During one of his stays in San Francisco Anderson drew the first 15 pages of the book. Despite a couple of rejections from publishers who thought the book was not "sophisticated enough" he sent the pages, unsolicited, to a publisher in Milwaukie, Oregon, Frank Amato. Amato's reaction was enthusiastic and for the first time he flew to meet a potential author. The book was published in 1978, virtually unedited, and was met with immediate success.

=== Later life ===
After publishing the book, Anderson worked with Early Winters to create the Curtis Creek Stalker, a set of fly-fishing equipment that included a custom-made four-piece fiberglass pack rod, a nylon shoulder bag that doubled as a creel, a tackle bag, a Ryobi 355 single-action reel, a weight-forward Scientific Anglers fly line, leaders, tippets, flies, hook hone, fly floatant, clippers, knife, flashlight, and a copy of Curtis Creek Manifesto.

In the late 70s Anderson was forced by his asthma and emphysema to move out of San Francisco and relocate to better climates. Living off of the royalties from the book, the modest revenue from Curtis Creek Stalker, and the occasional stint as a fly fishing guide for the Sierras, Anderson bought a weathered cabin in the high desert around Chiloquin, Oregon, close to the Williamson and Sprague rivers. He shared the cabin, dubbed by Anderson as the "Visqueen Manor", with Polly Rosborough, a pioneer of modern fly-fishing and author of Tying and Fishing the Fuzzy Nymph. While he spent summers in Chiloquin, the winters proved too harsh for his ailments and he regularly relocated to Las Vegas, where he stayed with his grandmother Hazel.

In 1980 Anderson wrote and illustrated Baron Von Mabel's Backpacking, a humorous guide for beginning backpackers, later translated into German and reprinted in 1993.

=== Death and posthumous work ===
On 31 March 1984 Sheridan, 47 years old, died in Las Vegas of an acute attack of emphysema.

Michael Sheridan, his younger brother, hired a plane and spread Anderson's ashes in the Golden Trout Wilderness, near Lone Pine, an area that Sheridan explored thoroughly, fishing its streams and high mountain lakes.

In 1989, climbing writer Joe Kelsey edited The Climbing Cartoons of Sheridan Anderson, a posthumous collection of Anderson's cartoons from published and unpublished sources.

== The legacy of Curtis Creek Manifesto ==
The Curtis Creek Manifesto was successful right from the start, selling thousands of copies. By the end of the 80s it was translated and sold in Germany as well as Japan, where it sold particularly well. By 2004 it had sold nearly 300,000 copies, and as of 2024 it has sold near one million copies, experiencing continuous publication with over 20 reprints.

The book has become a cult classic known to be one of the most enduring fly fishing manuals, something that "almost every fly fisherman has, knows, or recommends." Patagonia's founder Yvon Chouinard described it as "probably the best beginner’s treatise on how to fly-fish."

In the book Anderson urged its readers "to go forth and seek [their] own Curtis Creek — a delightful, unspoiled stretch of water that [they] will cherish above all others." (Note: While Anderson left the existence of a real Curtis Creek a mystery, fly fisherman and author Chadd VanZanten hypothesized that the real Curtis Creek may be an homonimous secluded creek in Blacksmith Fork Canyon, Utah, where Anderson fished as a young man.) Its publisher, Frank Amato, said that “other than Isaak Walton, [Anderson is] probably the single American who got more people fishing than anyone else.”

== Personal life ==
Anderson, who in adulthood reached over 6 feet and weighed over 200 pounds, was often described as making a strong impression, a ragged and rugged "big man with a full chest" that "talked with a growl" and had a "laugh you could hear all over the lodge". He was often compared to a pirate due to his long dark hair, his limp, and his all-black clothing which included the signature black cape that he wore even while fishing. He self-described as an "angler, artist, wanderer, eternal foe of the work ethic."

His parents did not have a peaceful marriage, with frequent spats often fueled by alcohol. Anderson himself was notorious for drinking often and abundantly, showing up in camp with a bottle of Jack Daniel's, emptying his friend's cabinets and drunkenly calling them in the middle of the night. He is reported to have said "from the first drink I ever had, I knew this was what I wanted to do."

Anderson married and divorced twice, both marriages childless and lasting less than two years. He described marriage as "an admission of failure."

== Sources ==
- Spence, Evelyn (2004). "Master of the Manifesto" (PDF). The Drake. Jackson Hole, WY. pp. 50–54. ISSN 2168-7021. Archived from the original (PDF) on 2024-07-13.
- Tallman, Brett (2017). "Searching for Sheridan: The Man and the Myths Behind The Curtis Creek Manifesto". The Flyfish Journal. Vol. 8, no. 4. Bellingham, WA. ISSN 1947-4539.
- Roberts, Don (2013). "Sheridan Andreas Mulholland Anderson, 1936-1984, Part 1 Larger-than-Life Visual Bard, Bohemian, and Boulder Rat". Northwest Fly Fishing. Vol. 15, no. 5. Seattle, WA. pp. 14–17. ISSN 1527-8255.
- Anderson, Sheridan (1978-06-01). Curtis Creek Manifesto: A Fully Illustrated Guide to the Strategy, Finesse, Tactics, and Paraphernalia of Fly Fishing. Portland, OR: Frank Amato Publications Inc. ISBN 978-0936608068.
