= Loch Spynie =

Small lake in Moray, Scotland

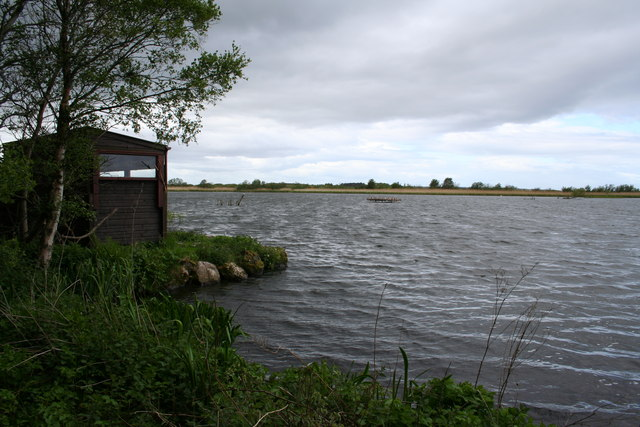
- Birdwatchers' hut on Loch Spynie
- Interactive map of Loch Spynie
- Location: Moray, Scotland
- Nearest city: Elgin
- Coordinates: 57.681944°N 3.280556°W
- Area: 0.94 km^{2} (0.36 sq mi)
- Established: 1992
- Governing body: Joint Nature Conservation Committee

Loch Spynie is a small loch located between the towns of Elgin and Lossiemouth in Moray, Scotland. Close to Spynie Palace, the ancient home of the bishops of Moray, it is an important wildlife habitat which is protected as a Ramsar Site.

== History ==
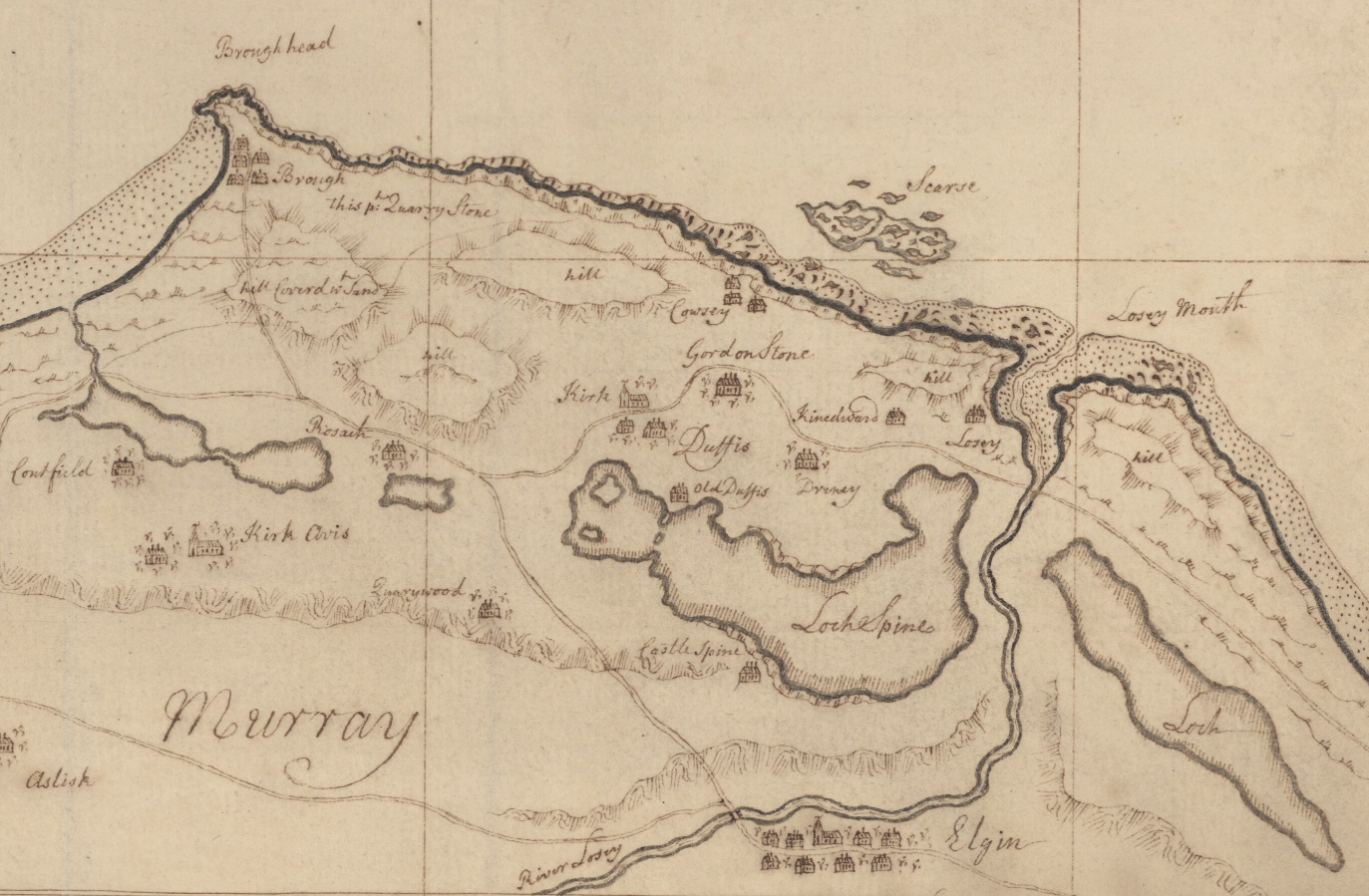
1730 military map of the Laich of Moray, showing the undrained Loch Spynie, the Loch of Cotts to the east of the River Lossie, and other freshwater lochs to the west

Loch Spynie is a remnant of a great wetland that stretched from the western shore of the current loch to the mouth of the River Lossie and, at that time, many of the settlements along the Moray coast were actually islands in the Moray Firth. The connections this area had to the sea silted up over the centuries but the loch was still navigable to the sea in the middle ages. In the mid-19th century the Spynie Canal was constructed by Thomas Telford to drain the loch for farmland. Artificial shores were built on the western and northern sides of the loch which were kept for wildfowling and fishing. Wildfowling has stopped altogether since 1981 and the amount of angling has been negligible since that year too.

In 1679 Janet Grant was convicted of stealing linen from a weaver in Gordonstoun, and taking and breaking open his money chest. She was sentenced to be drowned in Loch Spynie by the Barony Court of Gordonstoun.

== Natural history ==
Loch Spynie is a naturally eutrophic loch with extensive reed beds surrounding the open water. It is one of the few Scottish localities for alder swamp woodland, and has an unusual aquatic community including the nationally scarce slenderleaf pondweed. Loch Spynie regularly supports internationally important numbers of roosting greylag geese, with up to 5% of the Iceland population over-wintering at the site. Breeding birds here include grey heron, common tern, black-headed gull, water rail and little grebe, the gulls and terns nesting on artificial rafts. Osprey fish here in the spring and summer when marsh harriers may also be seen. In addition to the greylags, whooper swan, wigeon, teal, goldeneye and tufted duck arrive in the autumn some wintering. Other wildlife includes red squirrel, otter, common frog and common toad.

As well as being recognised as a wetland of international importance under the Ramsar Convention, Loch Spynie has been designated a Special Protection Area and Site of Special Scientific Interest. The Royal Society for the Protection of Birds (RSPB) has provided a bird hide and feeders which can be reached from the car park. The RSPB manage the loch and its environs as a nature reserve.

== Bibliography ==
- Peacock, J.D.; Berridge, N.G.; Harris, A.L.; May, F.; Brand, P.J.; Elliot, R.W.; Fenning, P.J. (1968). The geology of the Elgin district (Explanation of one-inch geological sheet 95). Memoirs of the Geological Survey of Great Britain. Edinburgh: HMSO. OCLC 1170272211.
- Stratigos, Michael J. (2021). "A Model of Coastal Wetland Palaeogeography and Archaeological Narratives: Loch Spynie, Northern Scotland". Journal of Wetland Archaeology. 20 (1–2): 43–58. doi:10.1080/14732971.2021.1930775. hdl:2164/21255. S2CID 235396161.
