= Spynie Canal =

Drainage canal in Moray, Scotland

Coordinates: 57.68713°N 3.27813°W

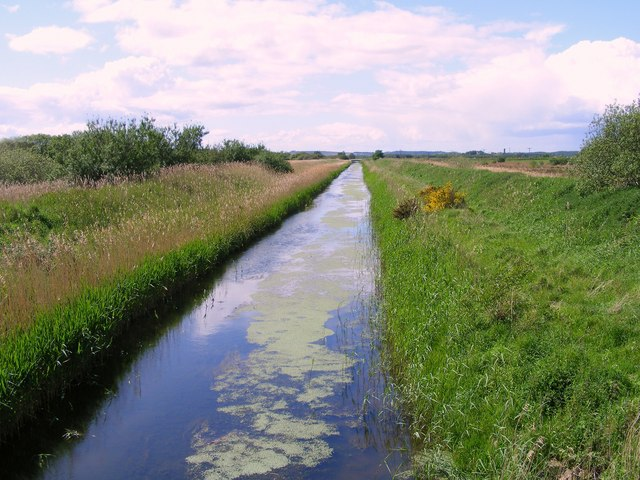
Spynie Canal

Spynie Canal is a canal in Moray, Scotland, which lies between Elgin and Lossiemouth. It drains into the River Lossie near its mouth at Lossiemouth.

== History ==
Spynie Canal was created as the culmination of attempts to drain Loch Spynie (which survives as a small loch) and the low-lying areas between Spynie Palace and Lossiemouth, the surplus water flowing through sluice gates at Lossiemouth. Thomas Telford was consulted in 1808 and the contractor for the work 1808–11 was a Mr Hughes, who had worked on the Caledonian Canal. The unprecedented floods of 1829 caused considerable damage and subsequently dykes were thrown up along the canal's banks.

== See also ==
- List of canals of the United Kingdom
