= Lewis Gordon (disambiguation) =

Lewis Gordon is an American philosopher.

Lewis Gordon may also refer to:

- Lewis Gordon (civil engineer)
- Lewis Gordon, 3rd Marquess of Huntly (c. 1626–1653)
- Lewis Gordon (Jacobite)
- Lewis Gordon (minister), moderator of the General Assembly of the Church of Scotland in 1815
- Lewis Gordon (footballer) (born 2001), English-born Scottish footballer

== See also ==
- Lewie Gordon, song from Jacobite Relics
- Louis Gordon, English musician
- Lou Gordon (disambiguation)
