= Cloddach Bridge =

Bridge in Moray, Scotland

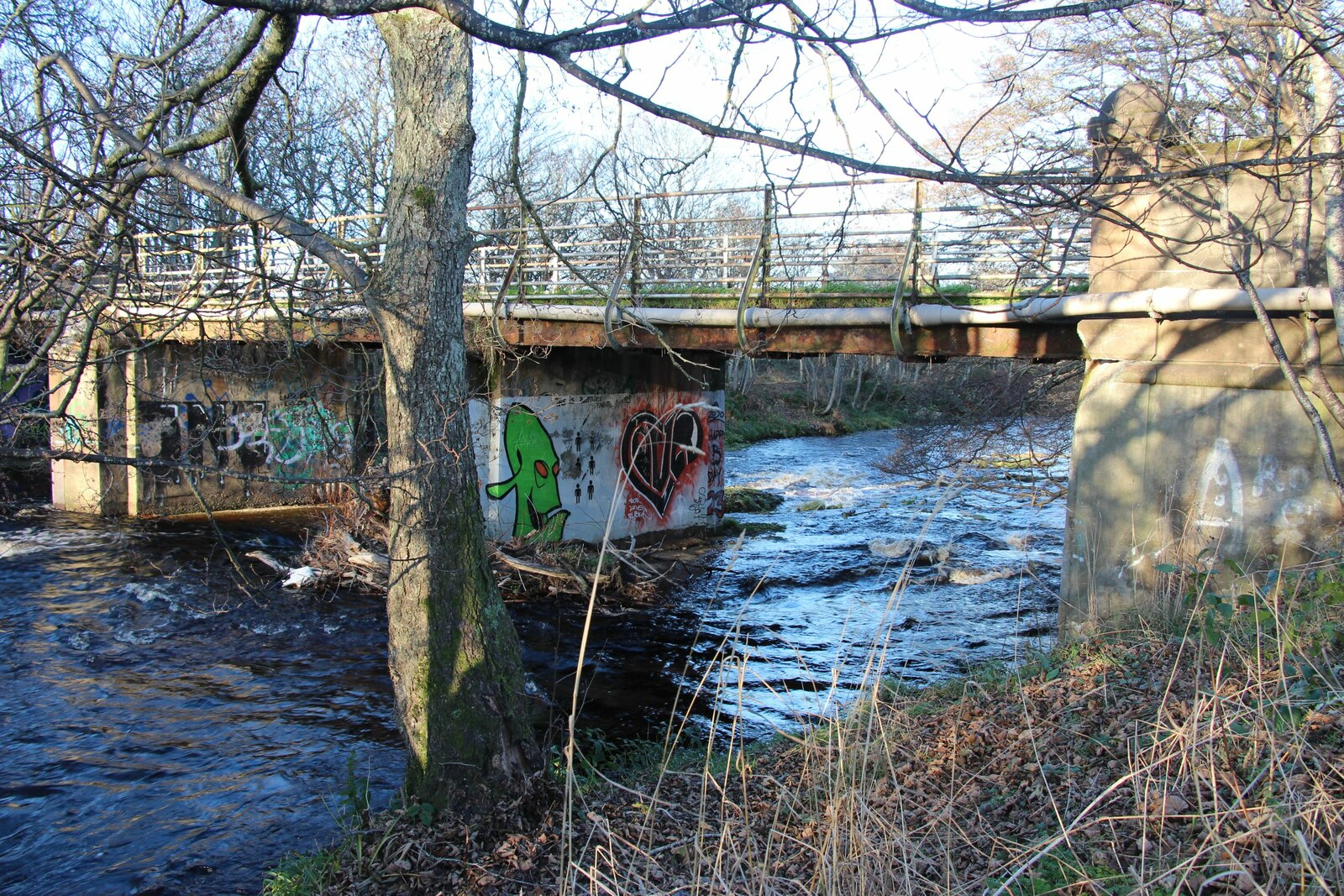
- Coordinates: 57°36′30.54″N 3°20′15.42″W
- Crosses: River Lossie

History
- Opened: 1905
- Closed: 2022 (motor vehicles)

Location
- Interactive map of Cloddach Bridge

Cloddach Bridge is a road bridge south of Elgin that crosses the River Lossie.

The bridge was completed in 1905, though it was first proposed thirteen years earlier.

In 2001, a 7.5 tonne weight restriction was introduced. In 2019, this was lowered to three tonnes. In 2021, a 2-metre height restriction was added to help enforce the weight limits, but it was hit numerous times. The bridge was closed to motor vehicles from 4 February 2022 following an inspection which revealed the poor state of the structure. It was estimated that replacing the bridge would cost £2.9 million while removing it would cost £333,500.

The Chancellor of the Exchequer, Jeremy Hunt, announced £1.5 million of funding would be provided to Moray Council to help fund repairs to the bridge, as part of his 2023 United Kingdom budget, which is expected to benefit those commuting regularly between Birnie and Forres.

== See also ==
- List of bridges in Scotland
