= Lossiemouth Town Hall =

Municipal building in Lossiemouth, Scotland

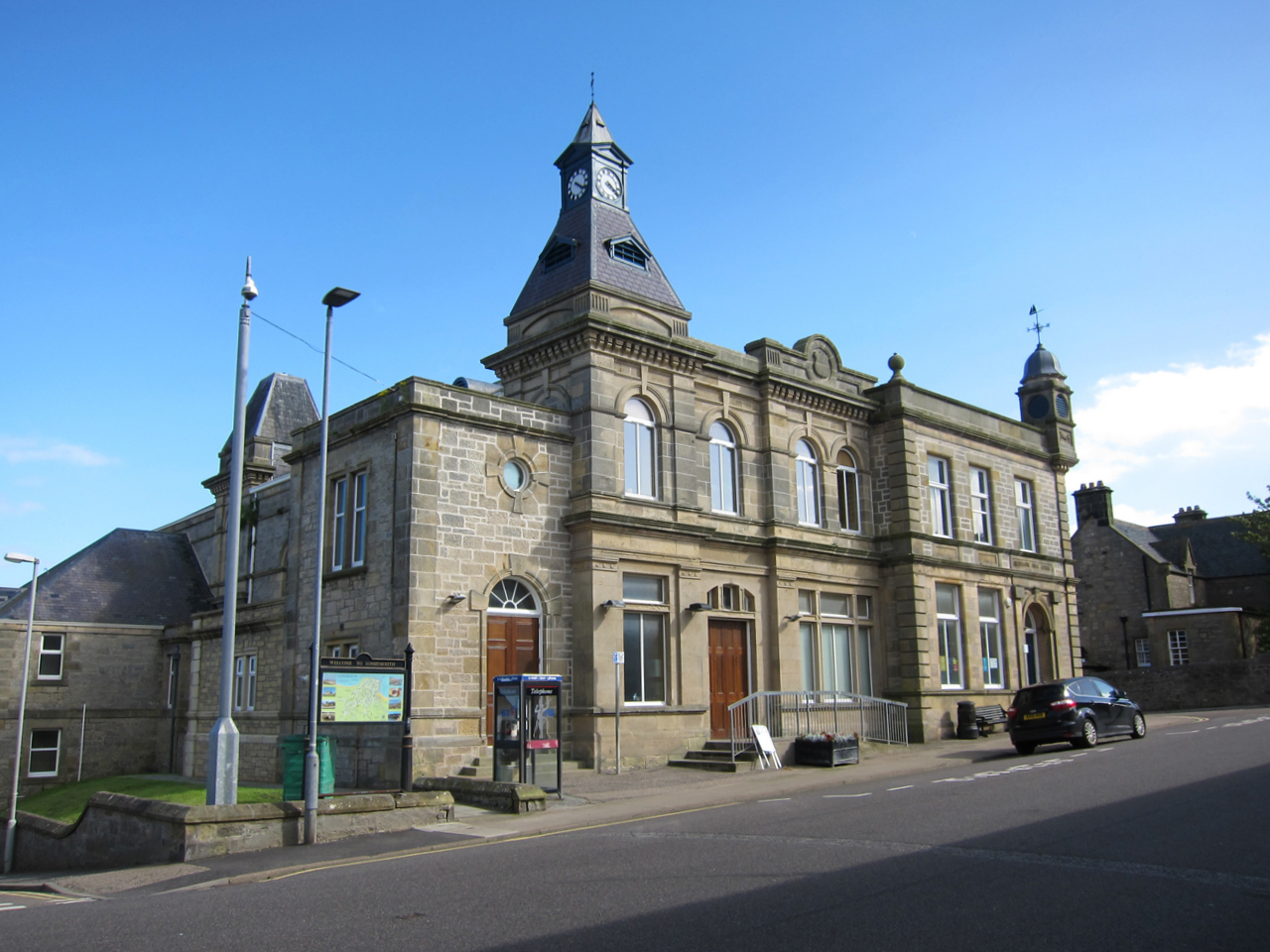
- Lossiemouth Town Hall

- Shown in Moray
- 57.7213°N 3.2816°W
- Location: High Street, Lossiemouth

History
- Built: 1885

Site notes
- Architect: Duncan Cameron
- Architectural style: Italianate style

Lossiemouth Town Hall is a municipal building in the High Street in Lossiemouth, Moray, Scotland. The building is currently used as a community events venue.

== History ==
Following significant population growth, largely associated with the shipping and fishing industries, Lossiemouth and Branderburgh became a police burgh in 1863. In this context, the new burgh leaders decided to commission a town hall: the site they selected was on the east side of the town close to the harbour. The new building was designed by Duncan Cameron of Inverness in the Italianate style, built in ashlar stone and was completed in 1885.

The original design involved an asymmetrical main frontage of three bays facing the High Street. The central bay, which was slightly recessed, featured a doorway with a tri-partite fanlight on the ground floor and a round-headed window with an architrave and a keystone on the first floor. The left-hand bay was fenestrated by a casement window on the ground floor and by a round-headed window with an architrave and a keystone on the first floor, while the right hand-bay was fenestrated by a tri-partite casement window on the ground floor and by two round-headed windows with architraves and keystones on the first floor. At roof level, there was a modillioned cornice and, above the right-hand bay, there was a parapet broken by a segmental pediment containing a carving. Internally, the principal room was the main assembly hall.

A pyramid-shaped tower, surmounted by a timber cupola with clock faces and with a weather vane, was installed above the left-hand bay in 1903. Sergeant Alexander Edwards of the 6th (Morayshire) Battalion, the Seaforth Highlanders, who had been awarded the Victoria Cross for his actions at the Battle of Pilckem Ridge on 31 July 1917 during the First World War, attended a reception at the town hall on 4 October 1917 when he received a presentation from the burgh council.

A three bay extension to the south to create a library was erected to a design by Reid & Wittet in 1904 and the complex was extended to the rear in 1931. Dances were held in the building, which was nicknamed "Stalingrad", during the Second World War. The building continued to serve as the meeting place of the burgh council for much of the 20th century, but ceased to be the local seat of government when the enlarged Moray District Council was formed in 1975. A local management committee took over the management of the building from the Moray Council in 2006: the committee went on to complete refurbishment works costing £750,000 over the subsequent decade. The building has continued to serve as a community events venue: regular performers have included the Glasgow-based opera company, Opera Bohemia, and the American rhythm and blues singer, Geno Washington, performed there in August 2019.
