= Gervadius =

Irish saint, hermit in Scotland

Saint Gervadius
- Born: Ireland
- Died: ~934 AD
- Venerated in: Roman Catholic Church; Eastern Orthodox Church; Anglican Communion
- Feast: November 8

Saint Gervadius (Garnat, Garnet, Gerardin, Gerardine, Gernard, Gernardius, Gervardius, Gervat) (d. ~934 AD) was an Irish saint. His feast day is celebrated on 8 November. He was an Irishman who established himself as a hermit in Scotland, near Kenedor (present day Kinneddar, Lossiemouth, Moray).

He may have emigrated to escape Viking raids in his native land. It is possible he may have been part of a Gaelic religious community that was present in Kinneddar in the 10th century, and who placed his cell in a cave in a rocky promontory to the east.

The early maps give reference to his having been there by naming the area Holyman's Head near Elgin. His cave became a place of pilgrimage right up to the Reformation and survived into the 19th century before being quarried out.

== Legends ==
A legend states that he lit flaming torches at night to warn ships away from the dangerous rocks. Another states that once, when Gervadius needed wood to complete the construction of a church, he was miraculously assisted by a river, which washed timber down to where he was working. An alternate version states that the river brought him food. The Life of Gervadius states that he met with Anglo-Saxon soldiers sent by Athelstan in 934.
