= Lou Gordon =

Lou Gordon may refer to:

- Lou Gordon (aviator) who flew with Amelia Earhart
- Lou Gordon (journalist) (1917–1977), American radio and television commentator, and newspaper reporter
- Lou Gordon (American football) (1908–1976), American football player

== See also ==
- Louis Gordon (born 1965), English musician
- Lewis Gordon (disambiguation)
