= David West (artist) =

- Born: 12 November 1868; Lossiemouth, Scotland
- Died: 7 October 1936 (aged 67); Glasgow, Scotland

David West (12 November 1868 – 7 October 1936) was an artist from Scotland. He was born in 1868 and died in 1936. His work was exhibited in France and South Africa.
