= East Beach Bridge =

Footbridge in Moray, Scotland

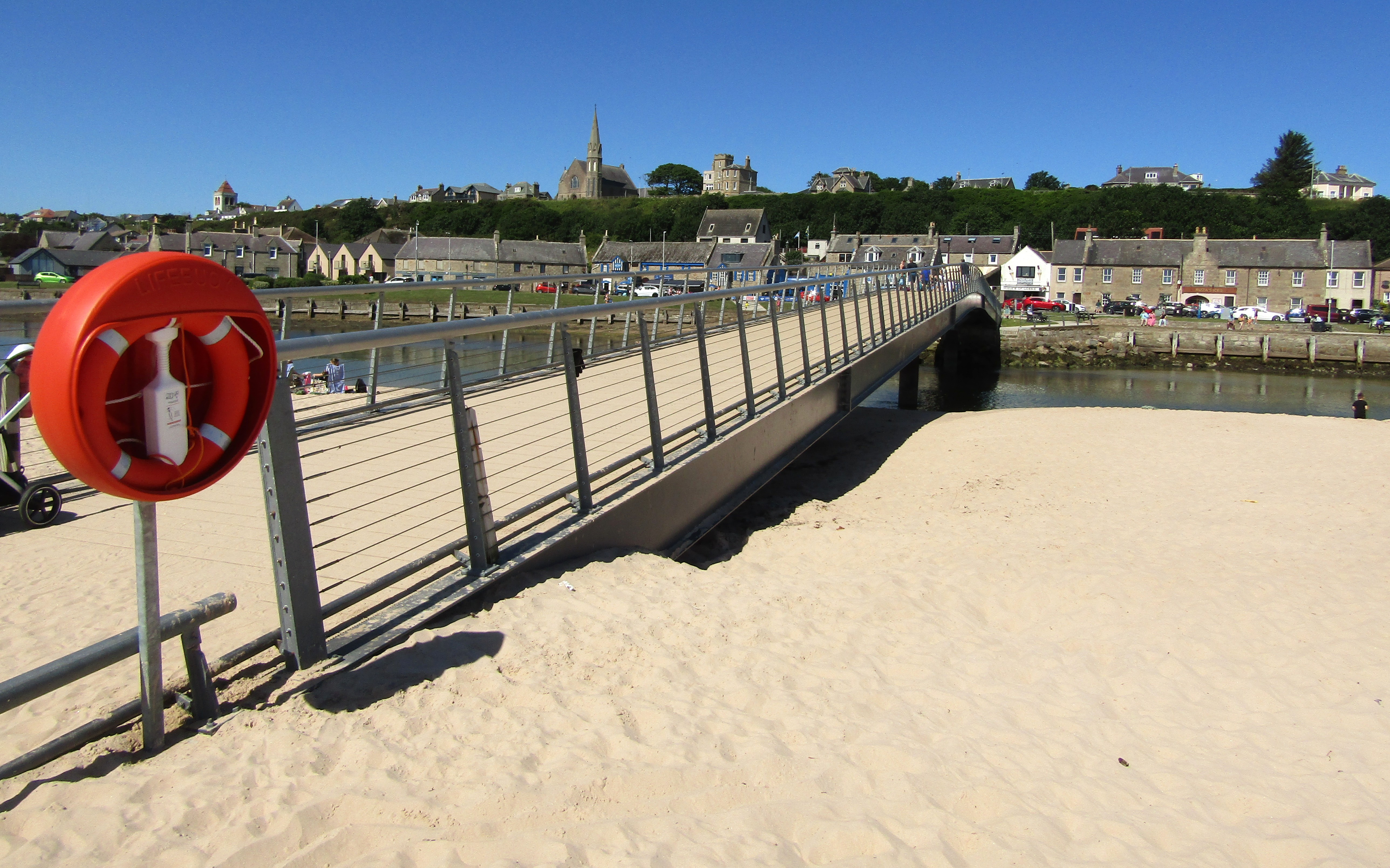
- The new East Beach Bridge
- Coordinates: 57°43′8.12″N 3°16′54.1″W
- Crosses: River Lossie
- Locale: Moray

Characteristics
- Total length: 75 m (246 ft)

History
- Designer: Beaver Bridges
- Opened: May 2022
- Replaces: East Beach Bridge (former)

Location
- Interactive map of East Beach Bridge

The East Beach Bridge is a footbridge crossing the River Lossie at Lossiemouth in Moray, northeast Scotland, connecting the town to East Beach. The original bridge was closed in 2019 and dismantled in 2022, and was replaced by the present structure opened the same year.

== History ==
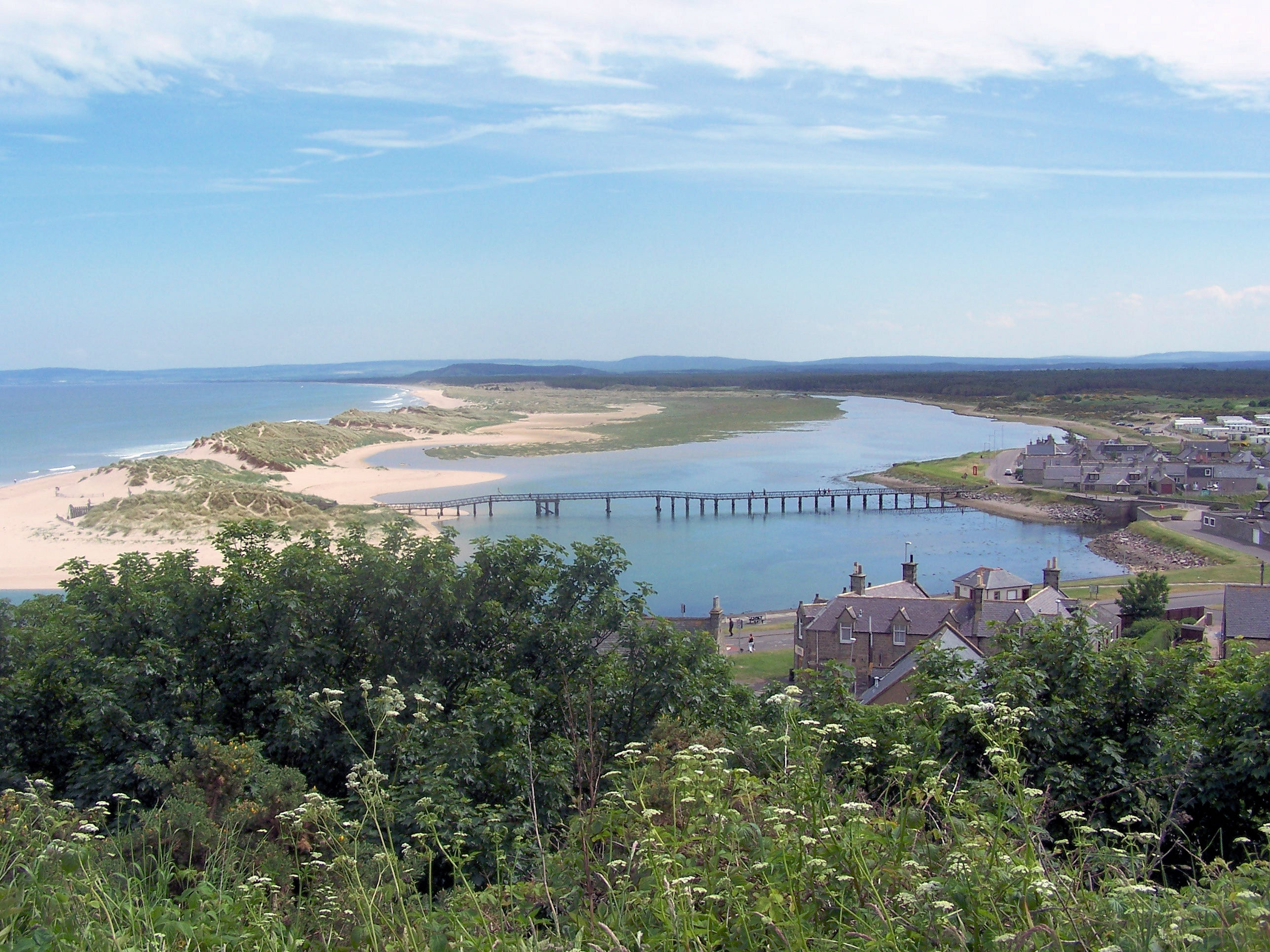
The former bridge, closed in 2019

The bridge was closed in July 2019 after an inspection. Members of the public had raised concerns that it was leaning to one side. The council blamed the deterioration of the structure on the large number of people using the bridge. The closure of the bridge resulted in a three-mile diversion to reach the beach via Lossiemouth forest car park and Arthur's Bridge.

In September 2019, it was announced that the Scottish Government would fund a new bridge. In August 2021, planning permission was given. The new bridge opened in May 2022. The old bridge was dismantled in June 2022.

== Design ==
The replacement bridge was designed and manufactured by Beaver Bridges of Glasgow and cost £1.8 million. The construction was funded by the Scottish Government; however, ongoing maintenance costs are covered by the council. It is approximately 75 metres (246 feet) long.

== See also ==
- List of bridges in Scotland
