= George Fraser (horticulturist) =

British horticulturist (1854–1944)

- Born: 25 October 1854; Lossiemouth, Moray, Scotland
- Died: 1944 (aged 89–90); Ucluelet, British Columbia, Canada
- Occupation: Horticulturist
- Awards: Pioneers Achievement Award

George Fraser (born 25 October 1854 in Lossiemouth, Moray, Scotland, and died in 1944 in Ucluelet, British Columbia, Canada) was one of the world's leading hybridizers, especially of rhododendrons.

== Early life ==
Fraser began his gardening career at the age of seventeen at Christies Nursery in Fochabers, Moray. He was then apprenticed at Gordon Castle, Fochabers. On completion of his apprenticeship, he spent the next four years studying horticulture in Edinburgh funding this by working on a local estate.

From there he worked in Mollance in Dumfries and Galloway, Scotland, then at Hartfield House in Renfrewshire. While still in his twenties Fraser took on the post of head gardener at Craigflower, Fife. His last position in Scotland was as head gardener at the large country estate of Auchmore, Killin, Perthshire.

== Life in Canada ==
In 1883, Fraser along with his sister emigrated to Canada and worked for the Canadian Pacific Railway for a time. He started a commercial greenhouse in Winnipeg but the cold winters made him move to the more temperate regions further west and settled in Victoria, British Columbia in 1885 where he established a successful fruit and vegetable garden. Then, in 1889, the city of Victoria commissioned John Blair, a landscape architect, and also a Scot, to design and produce Beacon Hill Park. Blair, knowing Fraser's reputation as a plantsman immediately hired him to be the foreman for the entire project.

In 1894, Fraser left Victoria for the remote fishing village of Ucluelet where he had bought 236 acres (0.96 km^{2}) for $236 two years before. At that time the village was only accessible by sea. Singlehandedly, he cleared enough of his land to establish his nursery. Hybridizing was his passion and this he did with honeysuckle, gooseberries, cranberries, roses and many more besides. His technique was to use the wild form of the plant and cross it with a domesticated version. His renown among hybridizers, however, was in producing rhododendrons crosses. His work was recognised internationally and recorded in the Gardener's Chronicle of London. Plant explorers and botanists corresponded with him, as did The Royal Botanic Garden, Kew and the Arnold Arboretum, Boston.

In 1919 he sent a specimen to the Royal Botanical Gardens at Kew, England. Kew named the plant Rhododendron fraseri.

== Horticultural honors ==
He became vice-president of the Pacific Coast Association of Nurserymen in 1928 and in 1936, the first Life Member of the Vancouver Island Horticultural Association. In 1991, the American Rhododendron Society presented him with the posthumous award of "Pioneers Achievement Award", a rarely given honor. Ucluelet produced a marble memorial in his honor and celebrate an annual George Fraser Day in May each year. The City of Victoria also recognised his contribution to the making of the beautiful Beacon Hill Park by installing a commemorative stone in his honor.
