= Alex Smith (engineer) =

Scottish industrial scientist and educator

Sir Alex Smith (15 October 1922 – 28 February 2003) was a Scottish industrial scientist and educator. Born in Lossiemouth, Moray, he was educated at Lossiemouth, Elgin Academy and, following the winning of a scholarship, Aberdeen University.

The Second World War interrupted his university years, but he returned to Aberdeen after serving the war years in the Royal Navy. After graduation, he went to work for Rolls-Royce, where he worked his way up to Head of Advanced Research and played a major part in the development of the RB211 aircraft engine.

On leaving Rolls-Royce, Smith took up the challenge of creating Manchester Polytechnic, which eventually become Manchester's largest university, Manchester Metropolitan. He was immensely proud of his achievements as Polytechnic's first director.

He died in Alderley Edge, Cheshire, England at the age of 80. His autobiography Lock up The Swings on Sundays was published by The Memoir Club.
