= Stotfield fishing disaster =

1806 maritime disaster in Scotland

Coordinates: 57°43′13″N 3°18′01″W

The Stotfield fishing disaster was the first of several fishing disasters of the 19th century on the east coast of Scotland. A storm struck the Moray Firth on 25 December 1806. Compared to the Moray Firth fishing disaster of 1848 or the Eyemouth disaster of 1881, the Stotfield disaster was small. However, although in other major disasters many more lives and boats were lost, the effect at Stotfield was arguably worse. There, the village lost its entire fleet of three fishing boats. More importantly, it lost all of its able-bodied men and youths in one afternoon.

== History of Stotfield ==
Stotfield has now been absorbed into Lossiemouth but originally it was a small ferm toun in Moray that was established in the Middle Ages. The name Stotfield is derived from Stodfauld meaning in Old English, "horse field". The fact that the name is a form of English and not derived from Pictish or Gaelic names suggests that incomers settled the area. King David I of Scotland introduced settlers from other parts of the kingdom as a way of reducing the powers of the lords who had ruled large territories as independent provinces. Indeed, King David put down a rebellion by the Mormaer of Moray in 1130 and it is possible that Stotfield dated from shortly after this event. The English speaking inhabitants of the Lothians would most likely to have been the chosen settlers. It is notable that the tribe inhabiting the Lothians were Angles (originally part of the Kingdom of Northumbria). Stotfield's close proximity to the sea eventually led it to develop a fishing arm to its farming activities. By the early 19th century, it had three skaffie style fishing boats, each crewed by seven people.

== Details of the boats ==
The early skaffie boats located on the Stotfield beach were small with rounded stems and raked sterns. They were two-masted with a tall dipping lug sail and a mizzen sail. Their short keel gave them good manoeuvrability in good weather, but they tended to be unstable in bad weather. They were usually crewed by around six people. Above all, though, they were light enough to be hauled up on to the beaches. The boats were un-decked and provided no shelter for the crew. Because of the vulnerability of the boats, they stayed only a few miles out to sea in full view of the land.

== The storm ==
The fishermen reached the fishing grounds, just a mile or two off shore, quite early. The morning began calm, fair and mild but the wind began to strengthen as the morning progressed and by around mid-day the weather took a dramatic turn for the worse and the south-westerly gale drove the boats away from land and down the firth. Although the men were powerful oarsmen the ferocity of the storm overwhelmed all three boats. All 21 people, men and youths, were drowned; only women, young children and the elderly remained in Stotfield.

=== Those who perished ===
Boat 1

- Joseph Young Snr, skipper
- Joseph Young Jnr, son to above
- Alex Young, also son to Joseph Young
- William McLeod, Elder
- John McLeod, son to above
- Alex Edward Jnr
- Robt Edward, brother to above

Boat 2

- Alex Edward, Skipper
- William Edward, son to above
- William Edward Snr, brother to Alex Edward
- John Edward, son to "Little" John Edward
- William Baikie
- James Edward, Boatswain
- James Edward, son to above

Boat 3

- James Mitchell, Skipper
- William Crocket, cousin by marriage to James Mitchell.
- John Young
- John Edward Jnr, "Fixie"
- Alex Main, from Nairn
- James McLeod, from Nairn
- John Edward Snr

== Elsewhere ==
A weather diary kept at Gordon Castle, Fochabers, Moray, stated that the temperature at 8 a.m. on this day was 50 degrees Fahrenheit. However, as the day progressed, the wind increased to hurricane force with trees on the estate being blown down. Later in the afternoon, the temperature dropped to 39 degrees Fahrenheit indicating the passage of a weather front. A schooner, Traveller, left Orkney early on this same day and ran into a huge storm. When the ship reached Kinnaird Head, Fraserburgh, Aberdeenshire, she was forced to return to Orkney where she was wrecked on the island of Flotta with loss of life to crew and passengers.

The Aberdeen Journal wrote:

. "On Thursday last (December 25. 1806), a most tremendous gale came on from the south-west. It began in the morning and continued increasing until about 11 o'clock, at which time it had all the appearance and force of a tornado. Its violence was severely felt in this city and neighbourhood... The accounts from all parts of the country represent the mischief done by this dreadful gale as beyond calculation - thatched houses unroofed barns and stables blown down: stacks of corn and hay scattered to the wind; and an immense quantity of large and valuable timber torn from the roots." (31/12/06). The late gale on this coast, we are much afraid, has been productive of more serious consequences than are yet ascertained. A number of vessels on this coast are still missing, and several fishing boats on the Moray Firth were driven out to sea in the violence of the gales and have not been heard of." (7/1/07)

In January the same newspaper wrote:

"In addition to the melancholy accounts formerly received, of the damage done by the late gale, we have to mention the loss of several vessels on the coast of Caithness... Five vessels names unknown, ashore in the Orkney Islands, twenty to thirty men supposed to be lost... We hear from Elgin, that three boats belonging to Stotfield, were lost, containing 21 seamen, who have left 17 widows and 42 children, besides aged parents and other helpless relations to lament their fate. Liberal contributions are making for their relief." (14/1/07). "In addition to the melancholy accidents of Christmas Day, we are very sorry to state the following losses: A boat with three men at Burghead; one boat with seven men at Rottenslough, near Buckle; and a boat with seven men at Avoch in Ross-shire; many of them leaving widows and families." (28/1/1807).

The paper later reported:

"We have much pleasure in mentioning, that a collection for relief of the widows and families of the unfortunate fishermen who perished in the tremendous gale of Christmas last, is to be made in all the (18) churches of this city, tomorrow (a national fast day; £190 3 11¾ was raised (11/3/07)... In the violence of that dreadful gale, the three boats of Stotfield, one boat of Avoch, one of Burghead and one of Port Essie, foundered. Thirty-seven industrious fishermen perished in the deep, leaving behind them 31 widows, 89 children and 56 aged parents or other relations, all ... by the fatal event, now rendered totally destitute." (25/3/07).

The paper carried this advert on 25 March 1807:

"such fishermen as will settle at Stotfield, in the parish of Drainie, and county of Elgin and Forces, that a bounty of seven guineas a year will be given for three successive years to the first crew of seven men who shall occupy a boat there in fishing, for that space, according to use and wont. A like bounty of seven guineas a year for two successive years, will be given to the second crew of seven men; and a bounty of seven guineas for one year only, to a third crew of seven men who shall settle at Stotfield."

It is unknown what response there was to this but it is certainly known that Garden brothers from the Buckie area settled in Stotfield at this time.

The minister of Drainie recorded in 1841 that of the total of £1075 13 0 collected for the Stotfield and Burghead Relief Fund, £35 remained to be distributed while there were still eight widows surviving.

Further afield, at Alnmouth in Northumberland, the storm burst through the coastal defences and caused the River Aln to change its course. Because of this the busy fishing harbour gradually silted up and the fishing industry disappeared. This demonstrated the extent and ferocity of this storm.
