= Alexander Edwards =

Recipient of the Victoria Cross

- Sjt. Alexander Edwards, V.C.
- Born: 4 November 1885; Stotfield, Lossiemouth, Moray, Scotland
- Died: 24 March 1918 (aged 32); Bapaume Wood, near Arras, France
- Burial place: Remembered on the Arras Memorial
- Military career
- Allegiance: United Kingdom
- Branch: British Army
- Service years: 1914 – 1918
- Rank: Sergeant
- Units: 1/6th (Morayshire) Bn, the Seaforth Highlanders, 51st Highland
- Conflicts: First World War: Battle of Passchendaele; Battle of Pilckem Ridge (WIA); German spring offensive †
- Awards: Victoria Cross

Alexander Edwards VC (4 November 1885 – 24 March 1918) was a Scottish recipient of the Victoria Cross, the highest and most prestigious award for valour in the face of the enemy that can be awarded to British and Commonwealth forces.

== Life ==
Edwards was born in Stotfield, Lossiemouth, Morayshire, the son of a fisherman, and became a cooper working in the herring fishery.

On 1 September 1914 he joined the 6th (Morayshire) Battalion, the Seaforth Highlanders, a part of the 51st (Highland) Division. After training in Bedford, the battalion travelled to France in May 1915.

=== VC action ===
Edwards, now a sergeant, demonstrated tremendous bravery and was awarded the Victoria Cross for his actions at the Battle of Pilckem Ridge on 31 July 1917 on the first day of the Battle of Passchendaele.

The London Gazette of 14 September 1917 recorded:

For most conspicuous bravery in attack, when, having located a hostile machine gun in a wood, he, with great dash and courage, led some men against it, killed all the team and captured the gun. Later, when a sniper was causing casualties, he crawled out to stalk him, and although badly wounded in the arm, went on and killed him. One officer only was now left with the company, and, realising that the success of the operation depended on the capture of the furthest objective, Serjt. Edwards, regardless of his wound, led his men on till this objective was captured. He subsequently showed great skill in consolidating his position, and very great daring in personal reconnaissance. Although again twice wounded on the following day, this very gallant N.C.O. maintained throughout a complete disregard for personal safety, and his high example of coolness and determination engendered a fine fighting spirit in his men.

Returning to Britain, Edwards received his Victoria Cross from King George V at Buckingham Palace on 26 September 1917. A week later he attended a reception in his honour at Lossiemouth, where he was presented with a gold watch and war bonds. He later returned to France and rejoined the 6th Seaforth.

=== Killed in action ===
On 21 March 1918 the Germans began their Kaiserschlacht (Spring Offensive). On 24 March Edwards was wounded and posted missing in action, presumed killed, at Bapaume Wood, east of Arras, France.

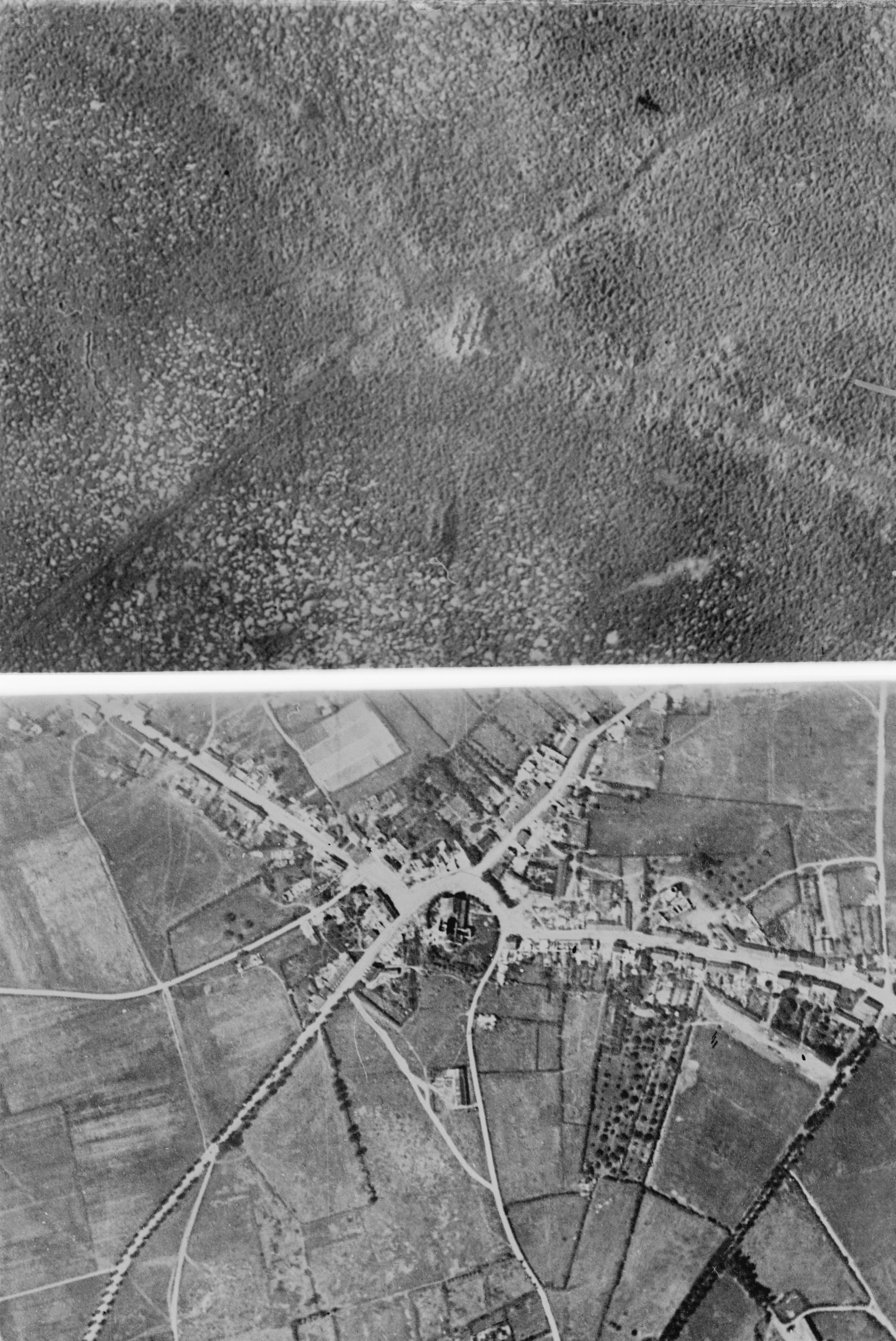
Passchendaele before and after the battle.

No body was ever identified, and Serjeant Edwards is commemorated at Bay 8 on the Arras Memorial.

The Moray Firth Golf Links at Lossiemouth have a sundial memorial to Edwards and his cousin, Captain G.E. Edwards DSO, who also died while serving with the 6th Seaforth during the war. As boys, both had acted as Caddies at the golf course.

== The medal ==
His Victoria Cross is displayed at The Highlanders Museum in Fort George, Inverness-shire, Scotland.
