= Lewis Gordon (minister) =

Scottish minister

Lewis Gordon (24 June 1747 – 29 June 1824) was a Scottish minister who served as Moderator of the General Assembly of the Church of Scotland in 1815.

== Life ==
Gordon was born in Forres on 24 June 1747, the sixth son of William Gordon, merchant. He trained as a minister at Marischal College, Aberdeen, graduating MA in 1765, was licensed by the Presbytery of Forres on 19 July 1768 and was ordained at Drainie on 28 September 1768. He served as minister of the parish of Drainie near Lossiemouth on the north Scottish coast from 1768. His parish included the (then) fishing village of Lossiemouth. The church dated from 1666.

He was elected Moderator in 1815 replacing David Ritchie and succeeded in 1816 by John Cook. At this time Gordon had been minister of Drainie for at least 45 years. He was made a DD by King's College, Aberdeen on 17 May 1815, the day before his appointment as Moderator.

He was translated to St Giles Church in Elgin on 5 September 1815, remaining in post until his death at Burghead on 29 June 1824.

== Family ==
Gordon married Elizabeth, daughter of Robert Logan, Minister of Rafford, on 7 March 1771. Their children were

- Robert Maxwell (9 May 1772 - 15 Feb 1785, Kinneddar);
- William (8 Oct 1773 - ?);
- John (5 June 1775 - 7 Feb 1802, Calcutta);
- Charles (28 Jan 1777 - 19 Apr 1804, during return from India on board the Harriet;
- Jean (9 Aug 1778 - 11 Jun 1795);
- Lewis (19 Oct 1780 - 5 Dec 1801, India), lieutenant HEICS;
- Fenella (15 Jun 1782 - 15 Feb 1823);
- Elizabeth (18 Jul 1783 - 4 Mar 1789);
- Robina (12 Feb 1785 - ?); and
- Robert (2 Apr 1786 - ?), captain Bombay Engineers.
