= Lossiemouth =

Town in Moray, Scotland

Coordinates: 57.7189°N 03.2875°W

Lossiemouth: Scottish Gaelic: Inbhir Losaidh; Scots: Lossie
- Town
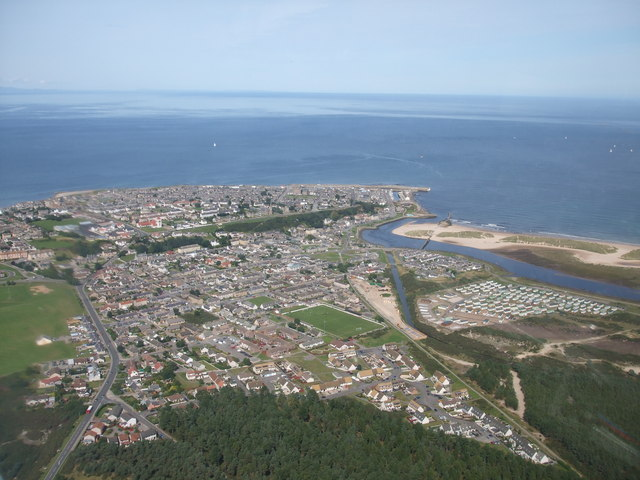

- Location within Moray
- Population: 6,654 (2022)
- OS grid reference: NJ235705
  - Edinburgh: 122 mi (196 km)
  - London: 447 mi (719 km)
- Community council: Lossiemouth
- Council area: Moray
- Lieutenancy area: Moray
- Country: Scotland
- Sovereign state: United Kingdom
- Post town: LOSSIEMOUTH
- Postcode district: IV31
- Dialling code: 01343
- Police: Scotland
- Fire: Scottish
- Ambulance: Scottish
- UK Parliament: Moray West, Nairn and Strathspey
- Scottish Parliament: Moray
- Website: www.moray.gov.uk

Lossiemouth (Scottish Gaelic: Inbhir Losaidh) is a coastal town in Moray, Scotland. Originally the port belonging to Elgin, it became an important fishing town. Although there has been over 1,000 years of settlement in the area, the present day town was formed over the past 250 years and consists of four separate communities that eventually merged into one. From 1890 to 1975, it was a police burgh as Lossiemouth and Branderburgh.

Stotfield, the first significant settlement (discounting Kinneddar which has now disappeared), lies to the north west of the town. Next was the Seatown – a small area between the river and the canal inholding of 52 houses, 51 of which are the historic fisher cottages. When the new harbour was built on the River Lossie, the 18th-century planned town of Lossiemouth, built on a grid system, was established on the low ground below the Coulard Hill. Branderburgh formed the final development during the 19th century. This part of the town developed entirely as a result of the new harbour with its two basins, and eventually covered the entire Coulard Hill; it has an impressive profile when seen from a distance.

== History ==
=== Roman to Medieval ===
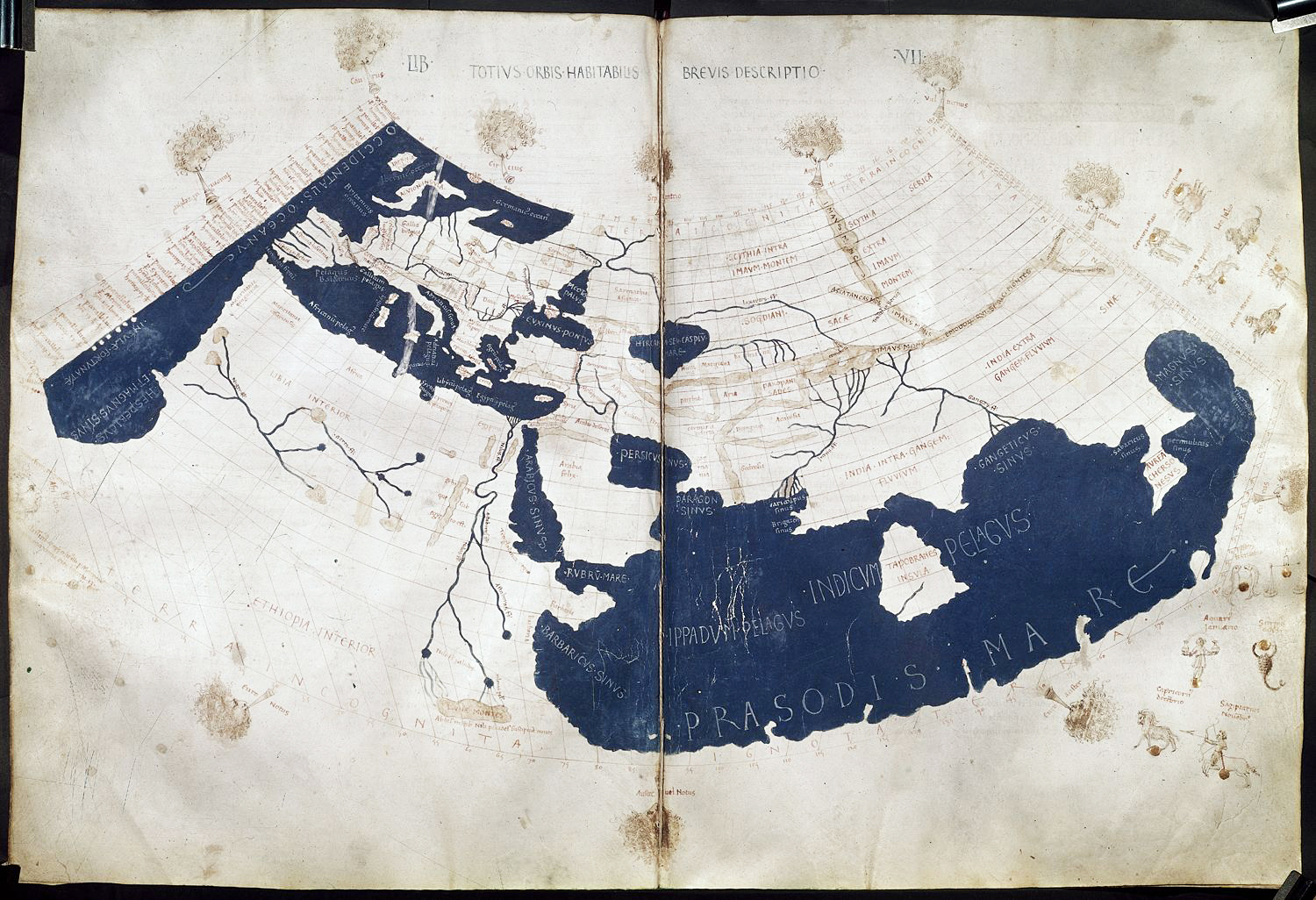
Ptolemy's World Map

Although the Romans never conquered the peoples of the north of Scotland, they made several journeys to the Moray Firth coast. Suspected Roman forts have been discovered at Thomshill, near Elgin and at Easter Galcantray, Cawdor, Nairnshire as well as a suspected marching camp at Wester Alves, Moray. The Greco-Roman astronomer and geographer Ptolemy (c. 90 – c. 168), describes in chapter two of his Geographa entitled Albion Island of Britannia the mouth of the River Lossie as ostium Loxa Fluvius. Settlement in this area has a long history. St Gervadius, a Celtic hermit, inhabited a cave overlooking the entrance to the sea loch, Loch Spynie. In his time, the River Lossie entered the loch further to the south, near Inchbroom. The rocky promontory is recorded in the Chartulary of Moray as Holyman's Head and it is said that Gervadius (St Gerardine as he became known in later times) would walk around the headland with a flaming torch to warn ships away from the dangerous rocks. Even today the Halliman Skerries retain the reference to St Gervadius. He died in 934 and his cave was a place of pilgrimage right up to the 16th century. The cave was eventually quarried out.

The settlement at the river mouth is significant particularly in its relationship with the royal burgh of Elgin. An argument between Alexander Bur, Bishop of Moray and John Dunbar, 4th Earl of Moray was documented in 1383 regarding the "ownership" of the port of "Losey". This document mentions that Losey was commonly known to fall within the limits of the episcopal estates. The Bishop's description of the port suggests that it was well downstream from his fishing station at Spynie. So it seems likely that Losey was not merely a fishing station but also a trading port that the Elgin burgesses used as a counterbalance to the Royal Burgh of Forres's trading port of Findhorn. The dispute with the Earl of Moray went further. That same year of 1383, the Earl wrote to the Elgin burgesses offering them the use of his port at the mouth of the River Spey with no duties, in an attempt to take trade from the Bishop. The port and fishery was mentioned again in 1551.

The loch and the river became separated around 1600. A succession of storms built banks of sand and boulders that eventually closed off the sea entrance. It is documented that in 1609, to avoid flooding, the post-Reformation Protestant Bishop Alexander Douglas took steps to exclude the River Lossie from the loch. Evidence of a sudden and apparently artificial right-angled bend between Caysbriggs and Inchbroom may indicate the location of this diversion.

Modern Lossiemouth has its origins in five separate communities that in time grew into one. These were Kinneddar, Stotfield, Seatown, Lossiemouth, and finally Branderburgh; the most ancient of these are Kinneddar and Stotfield.

=== Kinneddar ===
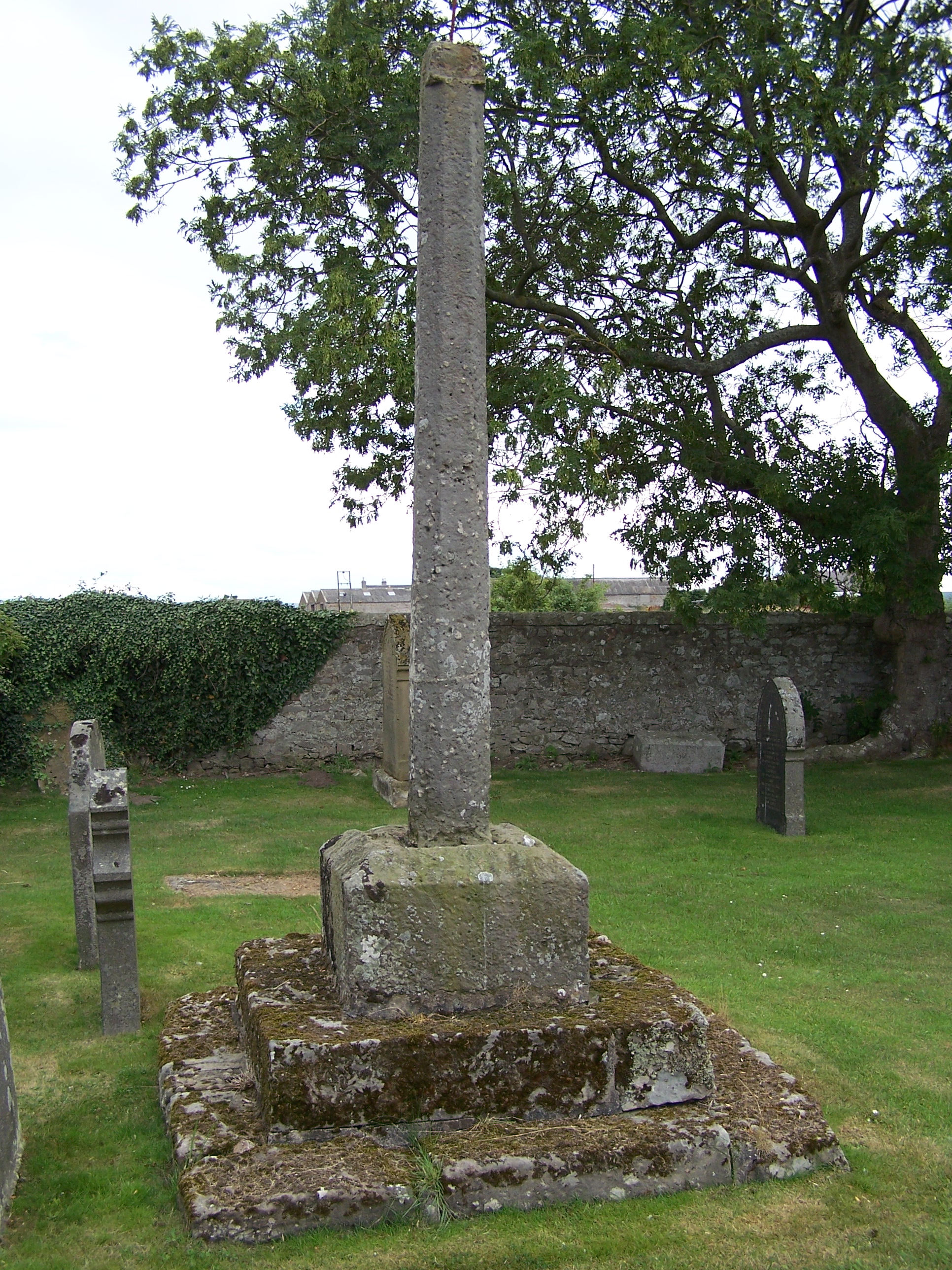
The mercat cross for Kinneddar village. Unknown age.

Kinneddar (Gaelic: Cinn Eadar) has now disappeared as a ferm toun, however an old farmhouse still retains its name and is probably its location. A Pictish settlement occupied the area and large numbers of carved stones, now held in Elgin Museum, were found. These stones date the settlement to around the 8th or 9th century. Pictish crosses were found in or near the cemetery and indicate the presence of a Christian establishment. Early documented references to the settlement refer to it as Kenedor dating it to the 10th century; it may, of course, have been a continuation of the original Pictish religious community. Saint Gervadius (Gerardine) is referred to as "Gervadius of Kenedor" and may have been part of this community, establishing his cell in the cave just to the northeast.

Bishop Richard is known to have resided at Kinneddar and for that period, it became the cathedral church of the diocese. However maps dating from the early 16th century clearly show this farming community as King Edward. It is unlikely, though, that this community took its name from King Edward I of England, The Hammer of the Scots, even though Edward travelled twice to this area to demonstrate his grip over the country; the most likely explanation is that the early cartographers took the local pronunciation of Kinneddar as King Edward and recorded it as such. He is known to have stayed in Elgin for four days in late July 1296 and it was during this sojourn into Scotland that he removed the Stone of Scone (Stone of Destiny) from Scone Palace and had it placed in a wooden chair at Westminster Abbey. He again stayed in Elgin for two days in September 1303 and then camped at Kinloss Abbey from 13 September to 4 October.

At that time the castle at Kinneddar, along with those at Elgin and Duffus, was left under the control of English garrisons. In 1308, Robert the Bruce, taking advantage of King Edward II's preoccupation with matters in England and France, started capturing and usually destroying castles that were either English garrisoned or controlled throughout Scotland. Joined by an army provided by David de Moravia, the Bishop of Moray, Bruce burned the castles of Inverness and Nairn before seizing and burning Kinneddar castle. He attacked Elgin castle only to be twice repulsed before finally succeeding. King Edward had the Bishop ex-communicated causing him to flee to Norway only to return after Edward's death.

Kinneddar village was still sizeable in the early 19th century but dwindled away with the building of the new Lossiemouth, just to the east.

=== Stotfield ===
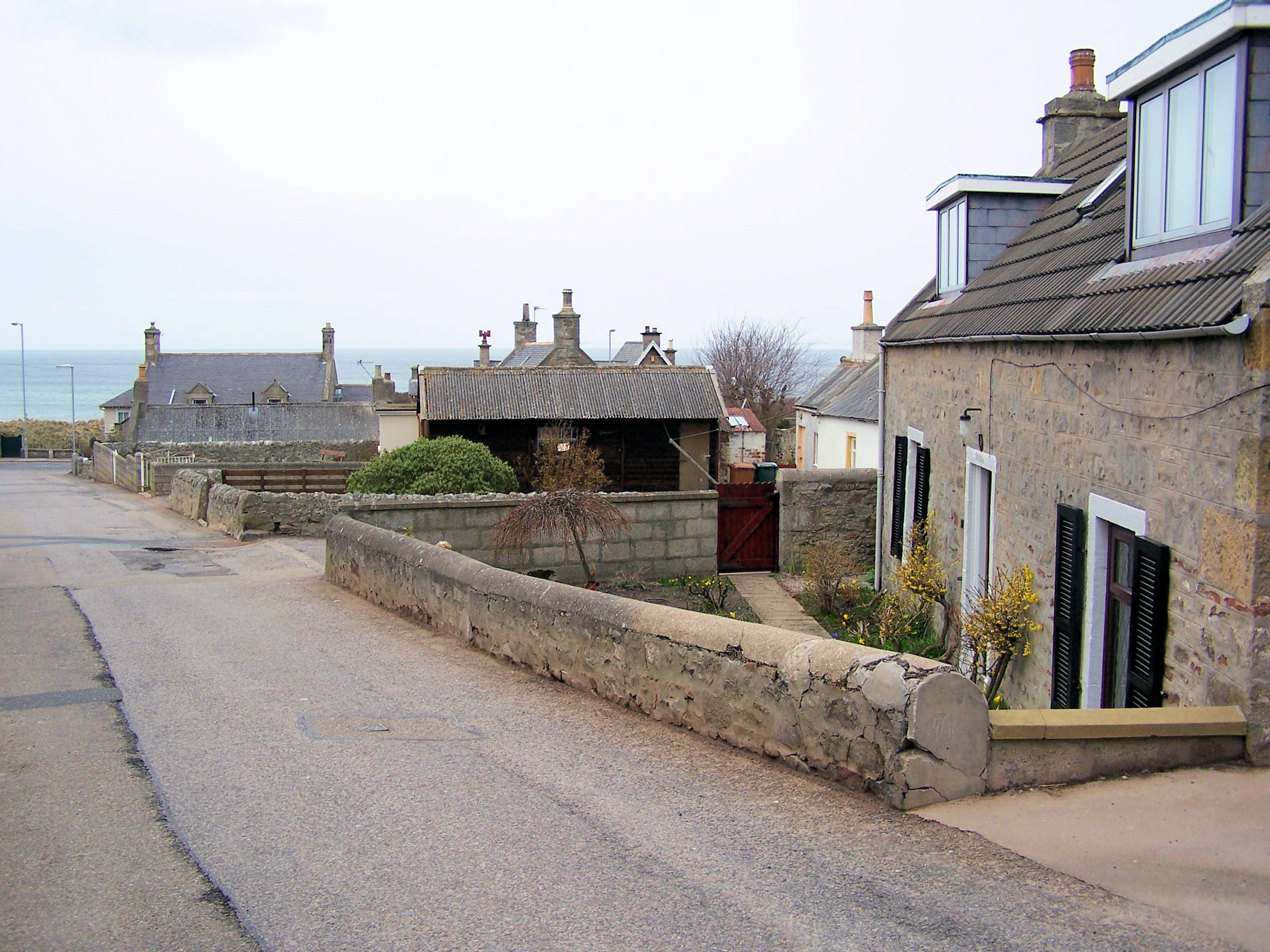
Stotfield houses on Tulloch's Brae

The early maps, some dating back to the early 16th century, clearly show Stotfield; some maps name the settlement as Stotfold or Stodfauld. The name Stotfold comes from the Middle Scots meaning, 'horse fold'. King David I introduced settlers from other parts of the kingdom as a way of reducing the powers of the lords who had ruled large territories as independent provinces. Indeed, King David put down a rebellion by the Mormaer of Moray in 1130 and it is possible that Stotfield dated from shortly after this event. The English-speaking inhabitants of the Lothians would most likely have been the chosen settlers. It is notable that the people inhabiting the Lothians were Angles (formally part of the Kingdom of Northumbria).

In the Middle Ages, Stotfield was primarily a farm hamlet with small-scale fishing. The fishing gradually became more important and the population specialised into farm workers and fishermen. However, the religious strictures introduced in the Reformation impacted the community, especially the fishers.

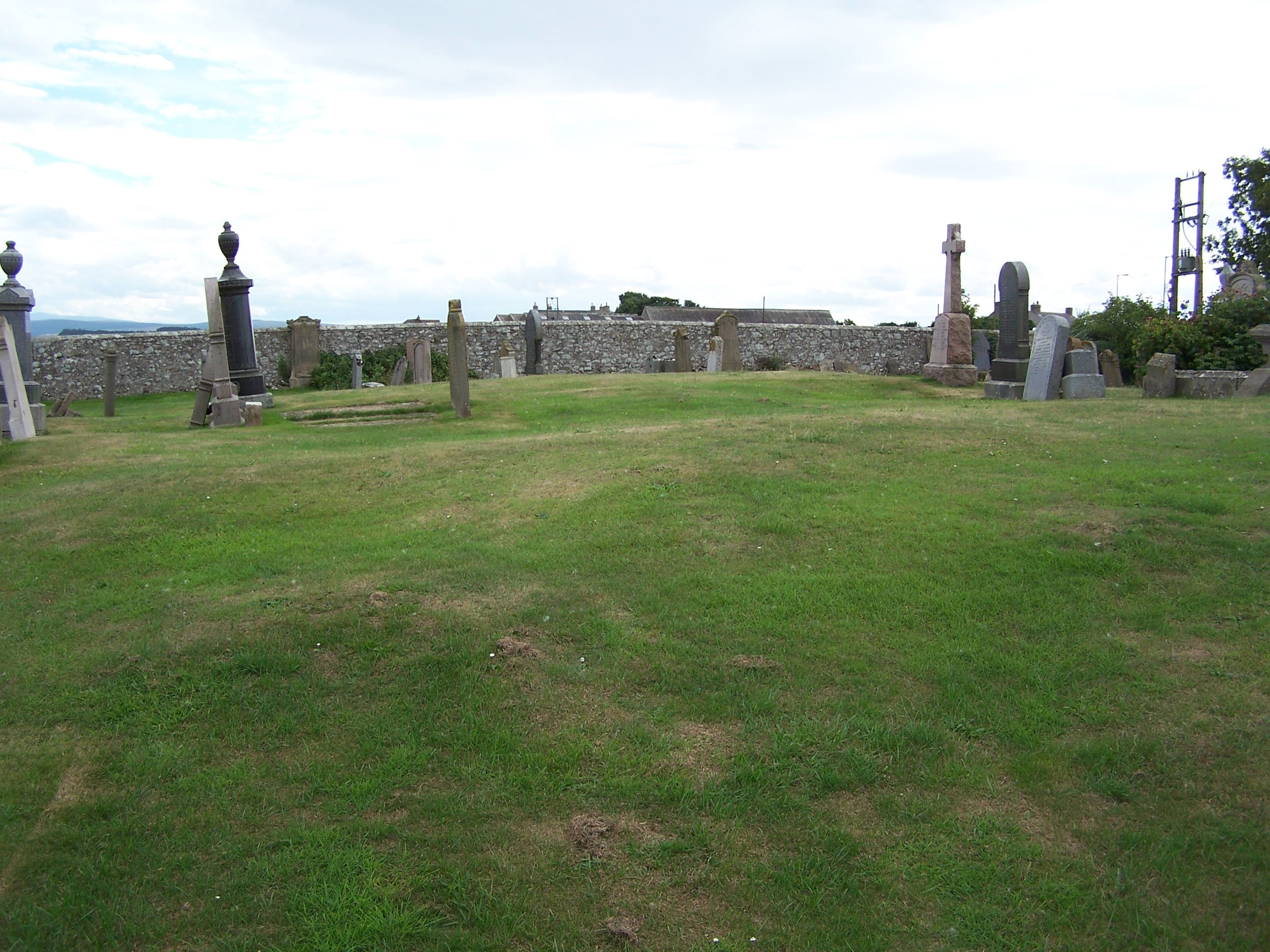
The raised ground within Kinneddar Cemetery (the Aul Cimetry) where the kirk stood, and where the Stotfield and Covesea fishermen were rebuked

The minutes of the Kinneddar Parish Kirk Session clearly show that the ancient superstitions were at least as important to them as observance of church niceties:

"17 Aprilis 1670 After Sermon the Session Assembling &c. The said day the fishers of Stotefold & Cousea being remitted from þe Presbetry to this Church discipline for satisfaction of þr (their) great & gross scandall & Idolatrous custome in burning torches on þe new years even The Presbetry having ordained þ' (that) those psons mor in accession in this transgression þn (than) oþrs (others) satisfy þe discipline in Sacco And oyra according to the arbitrement of þe Sessione. The Session do þrfore (therefore) ordain John Edward in Stotefold to satisfy in Sacco on day & to pay 20s James Jafray in Cousea to satisfy in the Joges two dayes, Wm Innes Wm Hesbein Thomas Edward & John Thome all of þm (them) to testify þr (their) Repentance by standing at þe pillar And ilk ane of þm to pay 20s. Alexr Innes owner of þe Boats of Stotefold, Wm Young owner of þe boats of Cousea each of þm are ordained to pay 4 libs (pounds). In regard that they had not restrained this abuse Conform to þr (their) engagement before þe Presbetry in Ano 66 (year 1666) The fors (four) psons (persons) all of þ snd Compeiring þr sentence being intimated unto þm they accepting & submitting to disciplin were sharpely rebuked exhorted to serious Repentance & enjoyned to satisfy conform to þe ordinance The next Lords day."

But the practices continued, and 35 years later the minutes from the session records stated:

"23 Dec 1705 Also after sermon þe min1' (the minister) did guard þe Seamen to beware of þe old Heathenish superstitious practice of carrieing of lighted Clevies or torches about þr boats on new years even certifieing all that should be found any manner of way to concurr with or contribute to þe said work—should be put in þe hands of þe civill magistrate."

This is interesting because it shows that the power to fine parishioners had by then been removed and put in the hands of magistrates.

Parish records from Duffus Kirk show that similar events were happening at Brughsea (Burghead). It is apparent, therefore, that Clavie burning was carried out in the three fisher towns of Brughsea, Causie (Covesea) and Stotefold (Stotfield). It is unlikely that this practice would have been restricted to the three Morayshire locations and likely that it would have been more widespread. Burghead still burns a ceremonial clavie on the eve of the old (Julian) new year but it is no longer associated with fishing boats. A puzzling date for the modern ceremony as the 17th-century ones were held on 31 December.

==== Stotfield fishing disaster ====
The Stotfield fishing disaster struck on 25 December 1806 and every able-bodied male in the village perished in the storm; this had an enormous effect on the Stotfield community. The folk memory of it is still retained among the fishermen of Lossiemouth.

=== Seatown ===
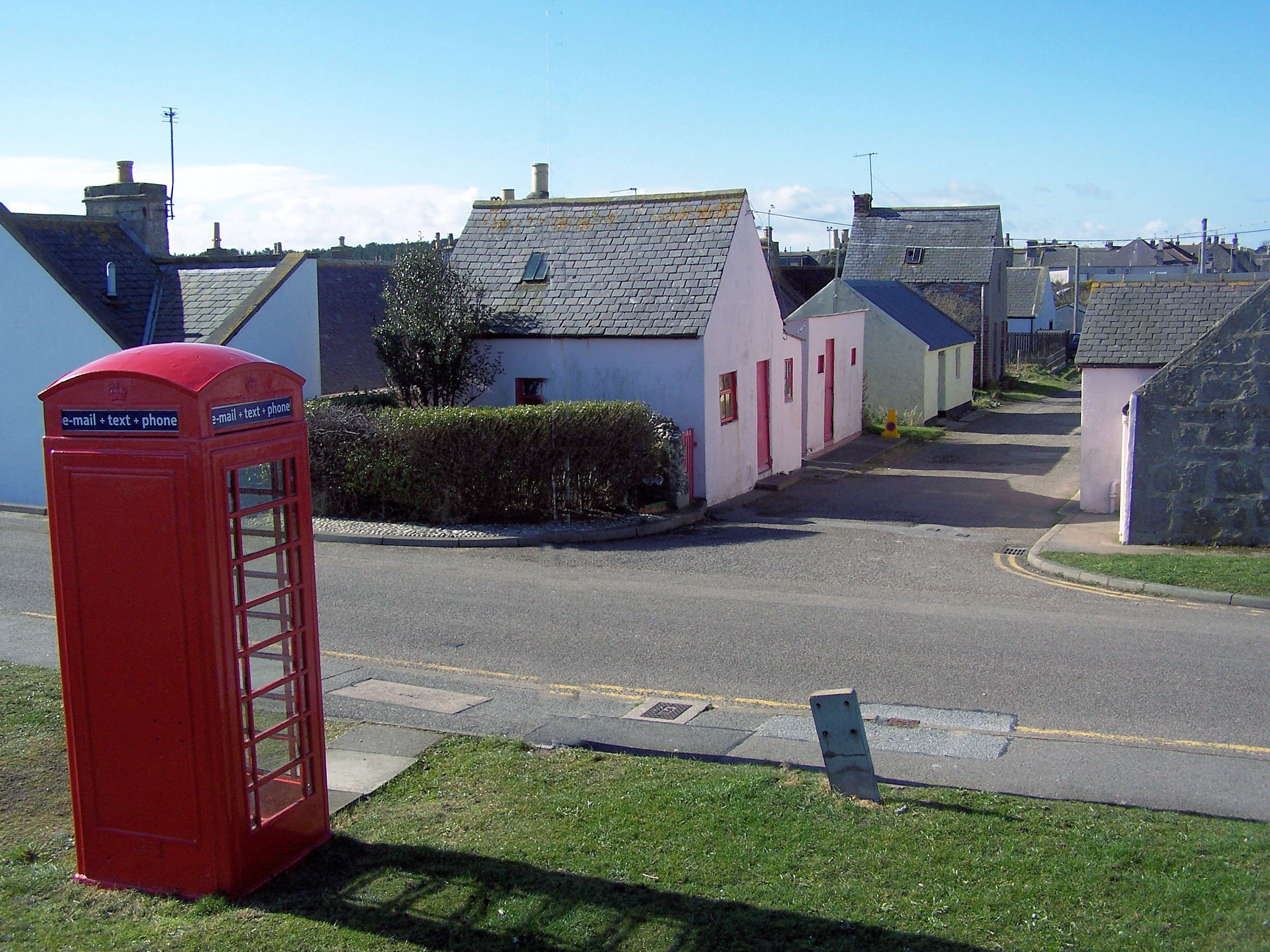
Seatown

The Seatown was established at the end of the 17th century when the old port at Spynie became landlocked. A succession of storms had built up large shingle banks to block the outlet of Loch Spynie to the sea. The merchants of Elgin decided that a new harbour that could berth larger trading vessels at the river mouth was required. The fishermen did not use the new pier, however, but continued to sail their boats up to the beach at the Seatown. Seatown is called The Toonie by its inhabitants and sometimes referred to as the Dogwall. This was a reference to dog-skins that were dried here before being turned into floats for nets.

=== Lossiemouth ===
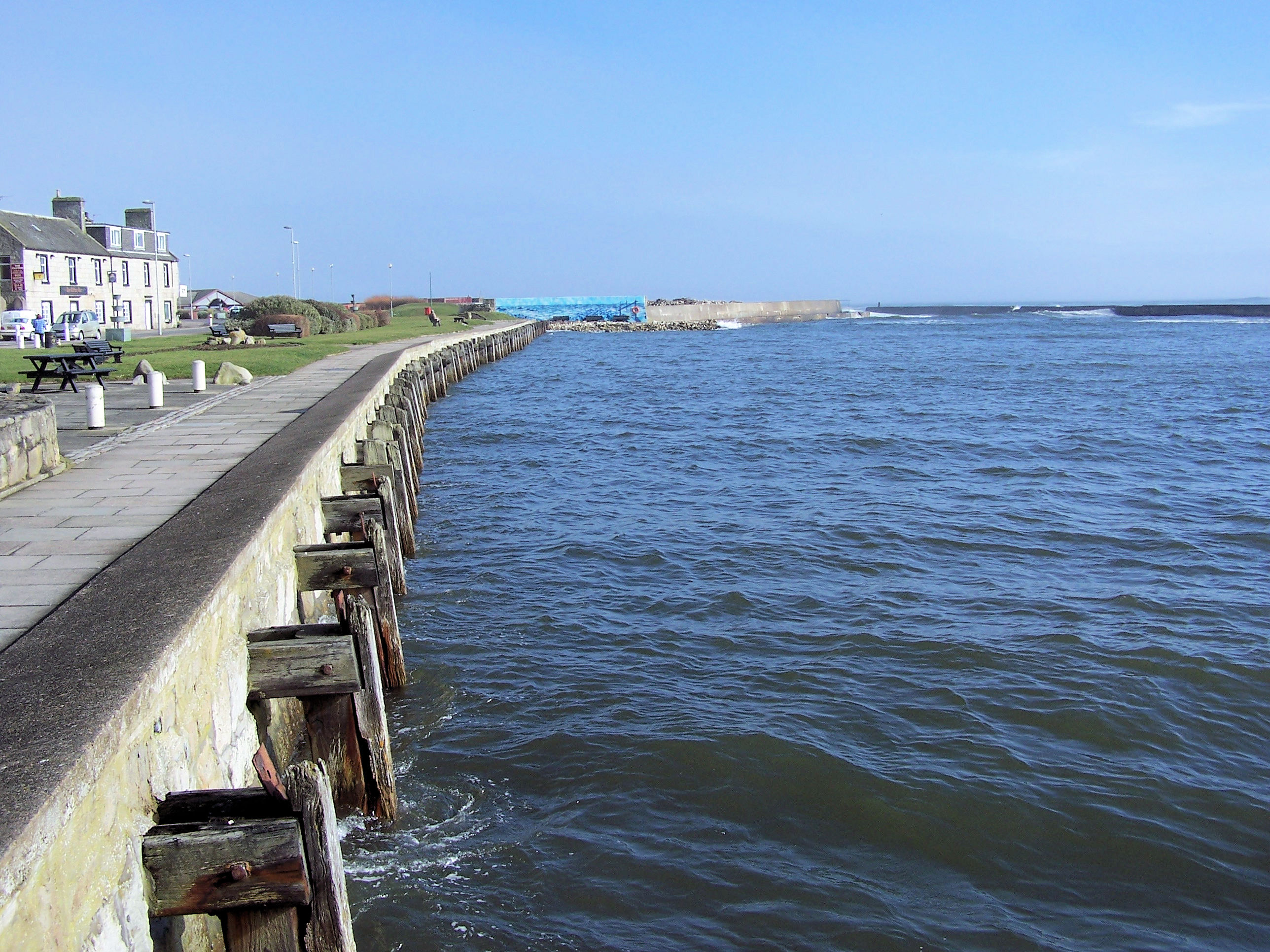
Lossiemouth first harbour built c.1765

In 1685, the Elgin burgh council called upon a German engineer, Peter Brauss, to look at the viability of providing a harbour at the mouth of the River Lossie; he decided that a harbour could be established. The first efforts at the beginning of the 18th century looked to have failed but by 1764, the new jetty had been built at a cost of £1200.

At the time that the new river mouth harbour was being constructed, so too was a more planned development laid out in streets running parallel and right angles to each other. An open square with a cross separated the first settlement from the new. The fishers occupied the houses at the Seatown and the builders, craftsmen and merchants in the new Lossiemouth. Later, a canal cut to drain Loch Spynie, would present a physical barrier to the two communities and entered the River Lossie in this area.

=== Branderburgh ===
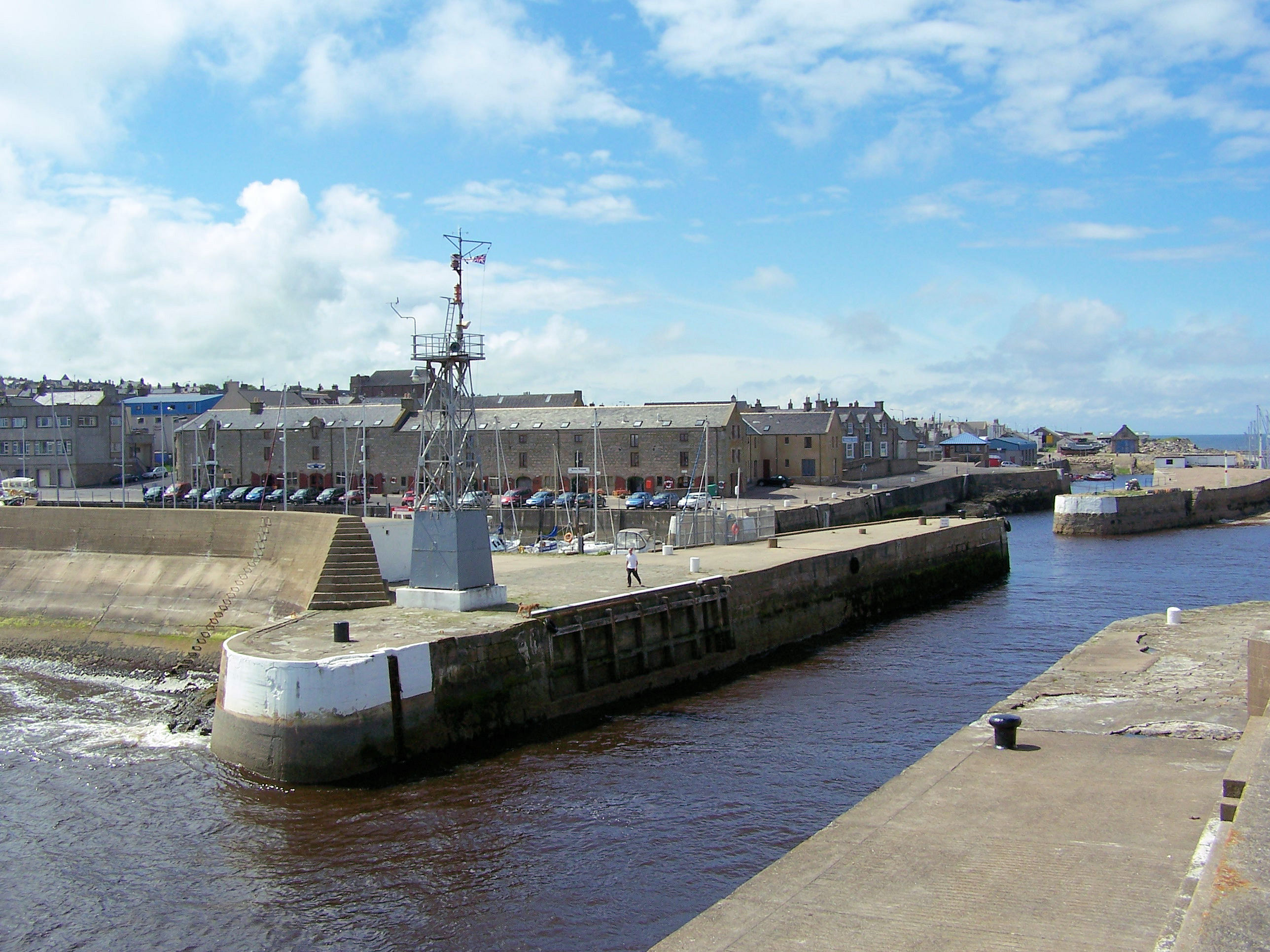
The Branderburgh Harbours at Lossie

By the early 19th century, the river harbour was busy but its long-term future was unsustainable and meant that a new solution was sought. In 1834, a Stotfield and Lossiemouth Harbour Company was formed to look into building a new harbour at Stotfield Point. That same year, The Inverness Courier carried the following:

"A paragraph is quoted from an Elgin paper under the heading "unexampled economy worthy of imitation." The two senior bailies of the burgh went on behalf of the town to Lossiemouth to meet the gentlemen appointed to stake off the ground for a proposed new harbour. The worthy Magistrates walked the whole distance, five miles out and five miles home, and only spent one shilling! This expenditure consisted of sixpence for whisky and the other sixpence to the waiter."

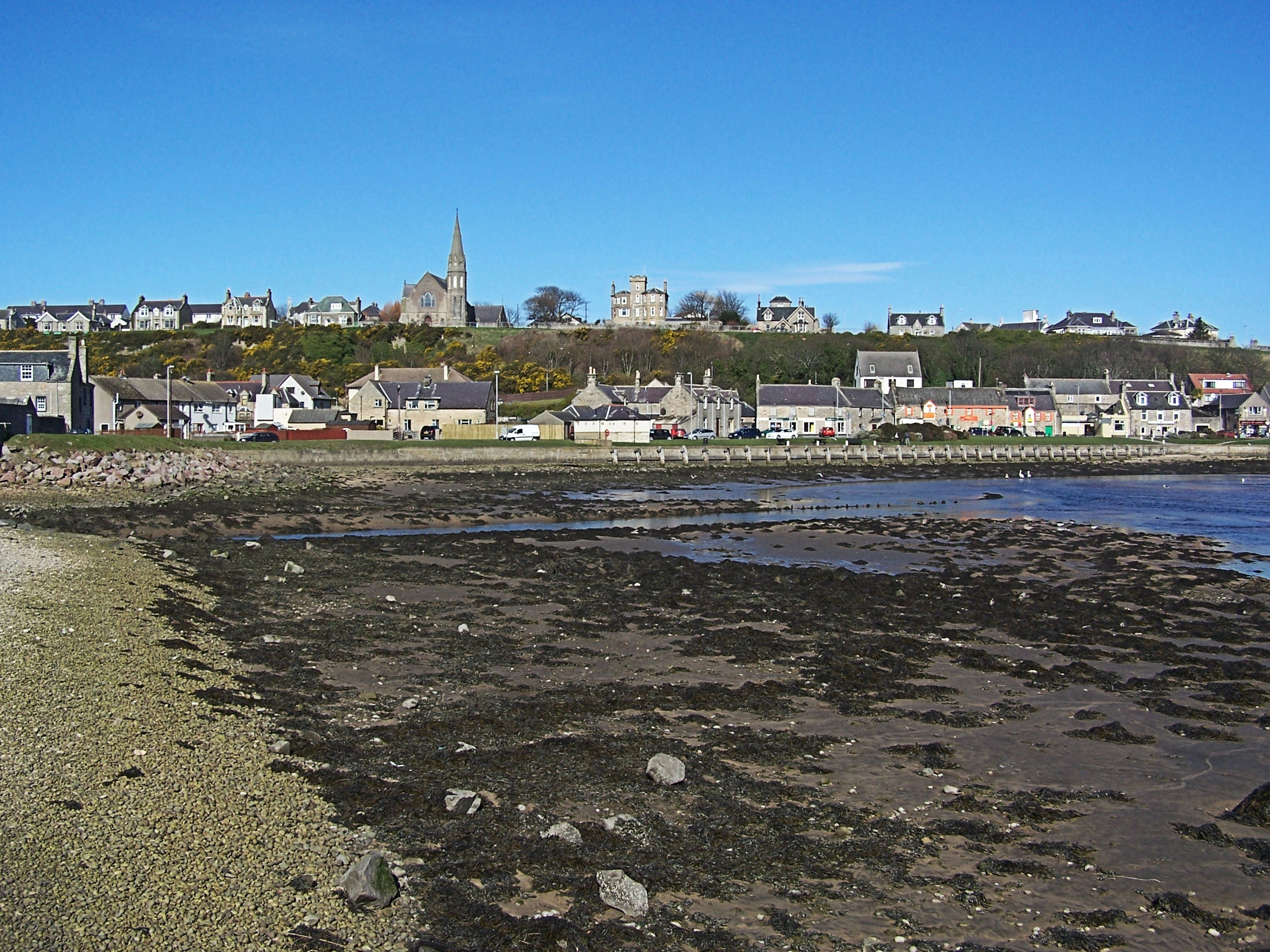
Nearest: the canal exit to the R. Lossie. Middle: the original Lossiemouth. Top: Branderburgh

The construction of the new harbour was carried out between 1837 and 1839 but initially in a relatively small form. The beginning of the building process was marked by a ceremony and reported in the Inverness Courier as follows,

"The ceremony of laying the foundation stone of the inner basin of the new harbour at Stotfield Point, Lossiemouth, took place on the 15th inst [June]. The stone was laid by Lieut. Colonel James Brander of Pitgaveny, the proprietor of the site, with the assistance of the Trinity Lodge of Freemasons, and in presence of the Chairman and shareholders of the Harbour Company, and representatives of the burgh of Elgin."

This was the beginning of the final phase of building that was to become Branderburgh. However, by 1858, the basin had been enlarged further and deepened to 16 ft (4.9 m) at spring tides. This encouraged many fishing families from up and down the coast to move to the town. The harbour as well as having a large herring fleet by now, also shared the available space with trading ships. This prompted the now renamed Elgin and Lossiemouth Harbour Company to build a new second basin at a cost of £18,000. This basin was intended solely for fishing boats and opened in 1860.

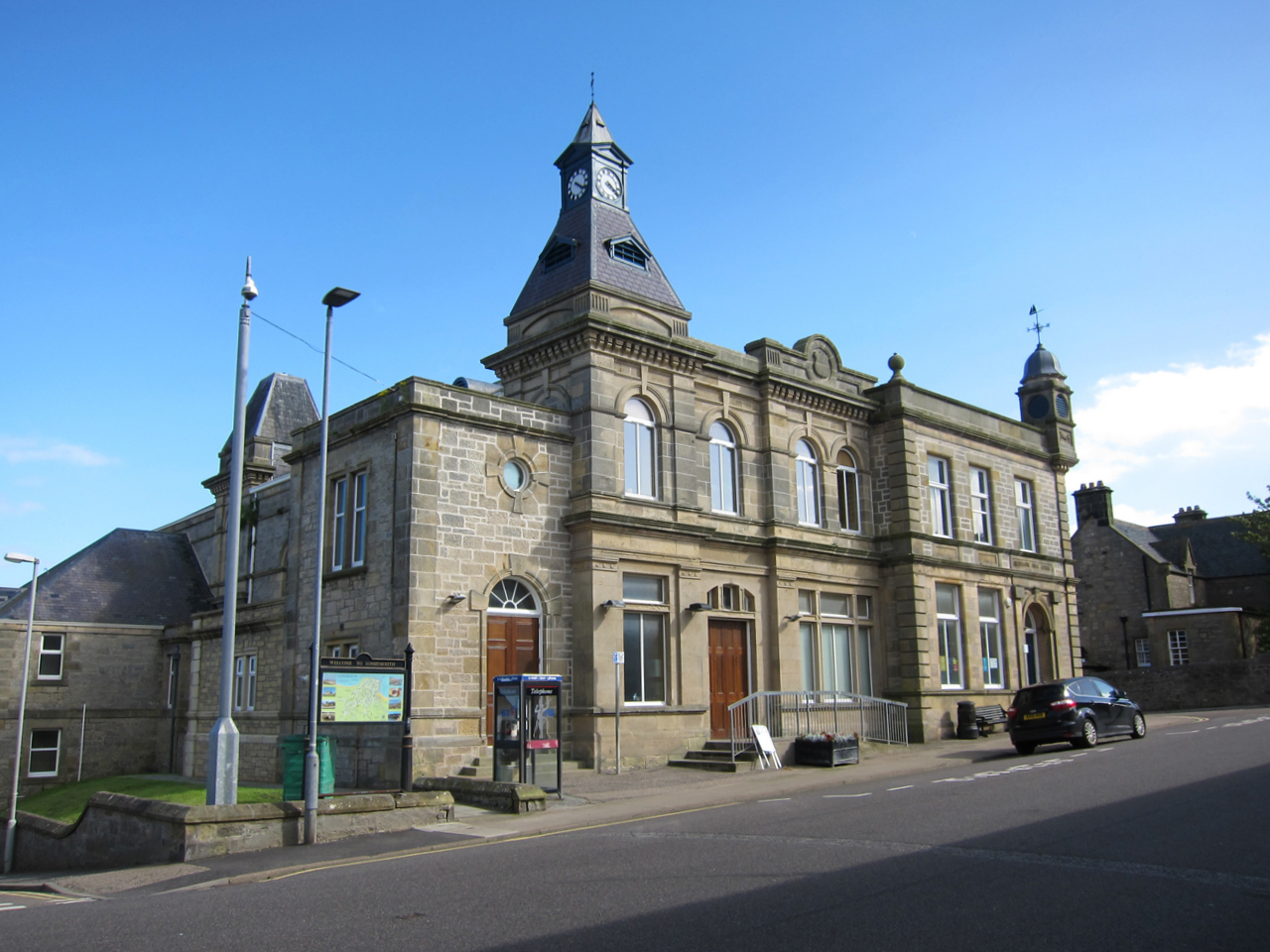
Lossiemouth Town Hall

Branderburgh, with its characteristic wide streets, continued to push its boundaries westward and by the early 20th century finally joined with Stotfield. A substantial amount of sandstone was quarried from the east side of the town to accommodate this rapid house building project. After Lossiemouth and Branderburgh became a police burgh in 1863, the town evolved to become known as Lossiemouth. Lossiemouth Town Hall was completed in 1885.

==== Fishing boats ====
The boats used at Stotfield, Seatown and finally Branderburgh were the same as those found across the entire Scottish east coast fishery. Chronologically, these were the two masted luggers, the Skaffies, Fifies and Zulus; then the powered Steam Drifters and Seine Netters.

- The Skaffie appeared at the beginning of the 19th century. These boats were initially small so that they could be easily beached, but later versions were heavier when large harbours became prevalent. Their stems were rounded and had raked sterns.
- The Fifie was the predominant fishing boat on the east coast from the 1850s until the mid-1880s. The Fifie's main features were the vertical stem and stern. Fifies built from 1860 onwards were all decked and from the 1870s onwards the bigger boats were built with carvel planking, i.e. the planks were laid edge to edge instead of the overlapping clinker style of previous boats. Some boats were built up to about 70 ft (21 m) in length and were very fast.
- The Zulu took its name from the Zulu war that was raging in South Africa at the time. Lossiemouth fisherman William 'Dad' Campbell was the first to introduce this form of fishing boat. His boat, the Nonesuch, had the characteristic vertical stem and steeply raking stern. The Zulu Boats rapidly became very popular in Lossiemouth and then along the whole of the east coast. Because these boats were ultimately very big and fast, they could reach the fishing grounds quickly and return with the catch equally fast.
- The Steam Drifters were so called because just like the Fifies and Zulus, they used drift nets. They were large boats, usually 80–90 ft (24–27 m) in length with a beam of around 20 ft (6 m). Steam drifters had many advantages. They were usually about 20 ft (6 m) longer than the sailing vessels, so they could carry more nets and catch more fish. This was important because the market was growing quickly at the beginning of the 20th century. They could travel faster and further and with greater freedom from weather, wind and tide. Because less time was spent travelling to and from the fishing grounds, more time could be spent fishing. However they did have disadvantages: they were expensive to build and run and as the herring fishery declined they became too expensive to operate.
- The Seine Netters initially were converted Fifies and Zulus. From 1906, petrol and paraffin engines began to be installed, initially for auxiliary power. However, as more powerful engines became available, sails (apart from the mizzen sail) were dispensed with. Danish seine net boats were landing huge quantities of plaice and other white fish at English east coast ports. Lossiemouth fishermen noted this and a few decided to use the seine net. It was obvious that this would be successful, but they were still hampered by the design and cost of the majority steam boats. John Campbell, nephew of William Campbell who designed the first Zulu boat, saw that a new design was needed to accommodate the large amounts of white fish that could be caught. His boat, the Marigold, did very well and over a short period the entire fleet (the first in Scotland) converted to the seine net.

The following statistics show that fishing was still thriving in the years before the First World War. The Six-inch Second Edition Ordnance Survey Map from this period shows how at that time the railway led directly into the harbour area.

Fishery Statistics

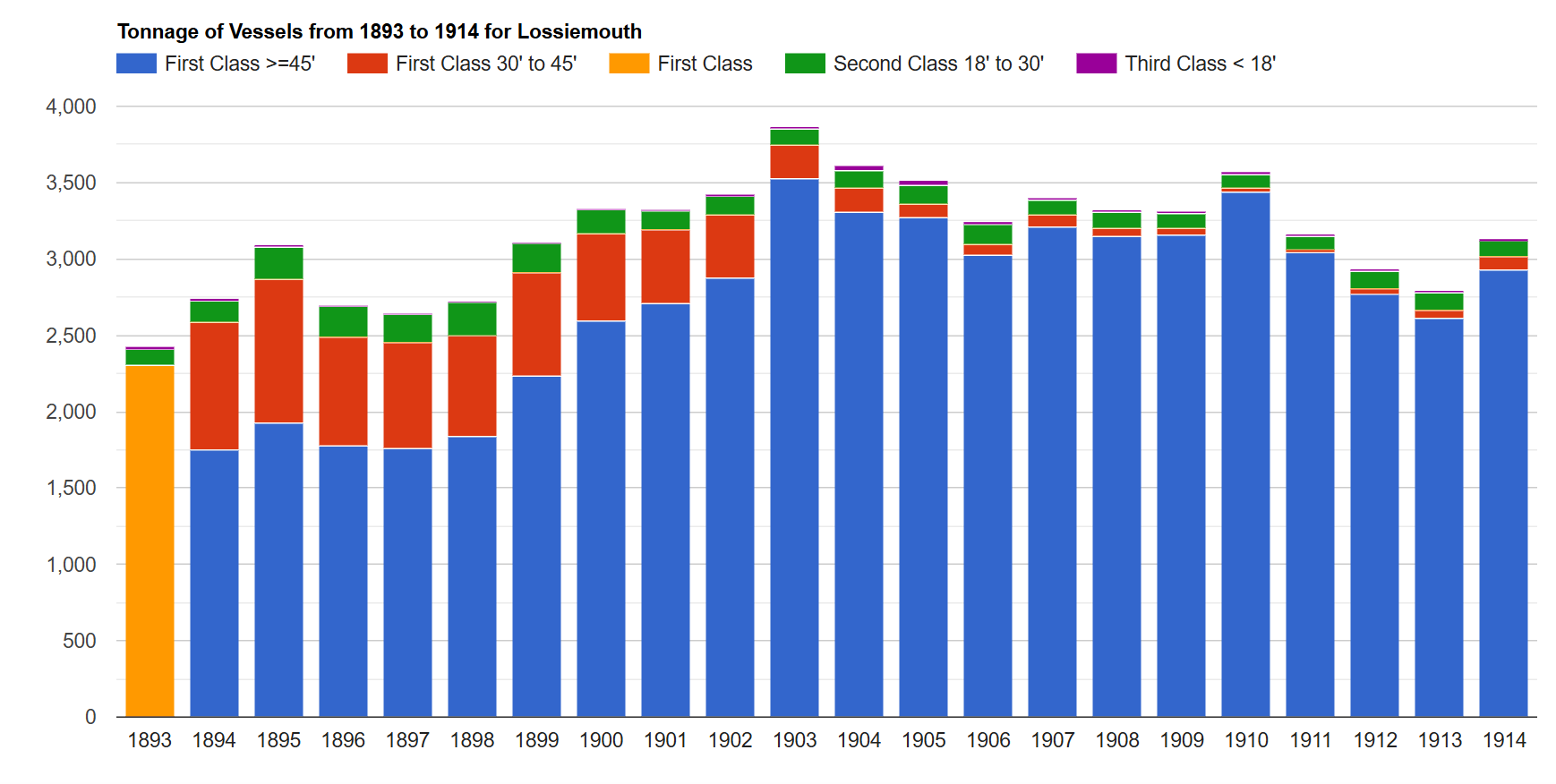
Tonnage of vessels

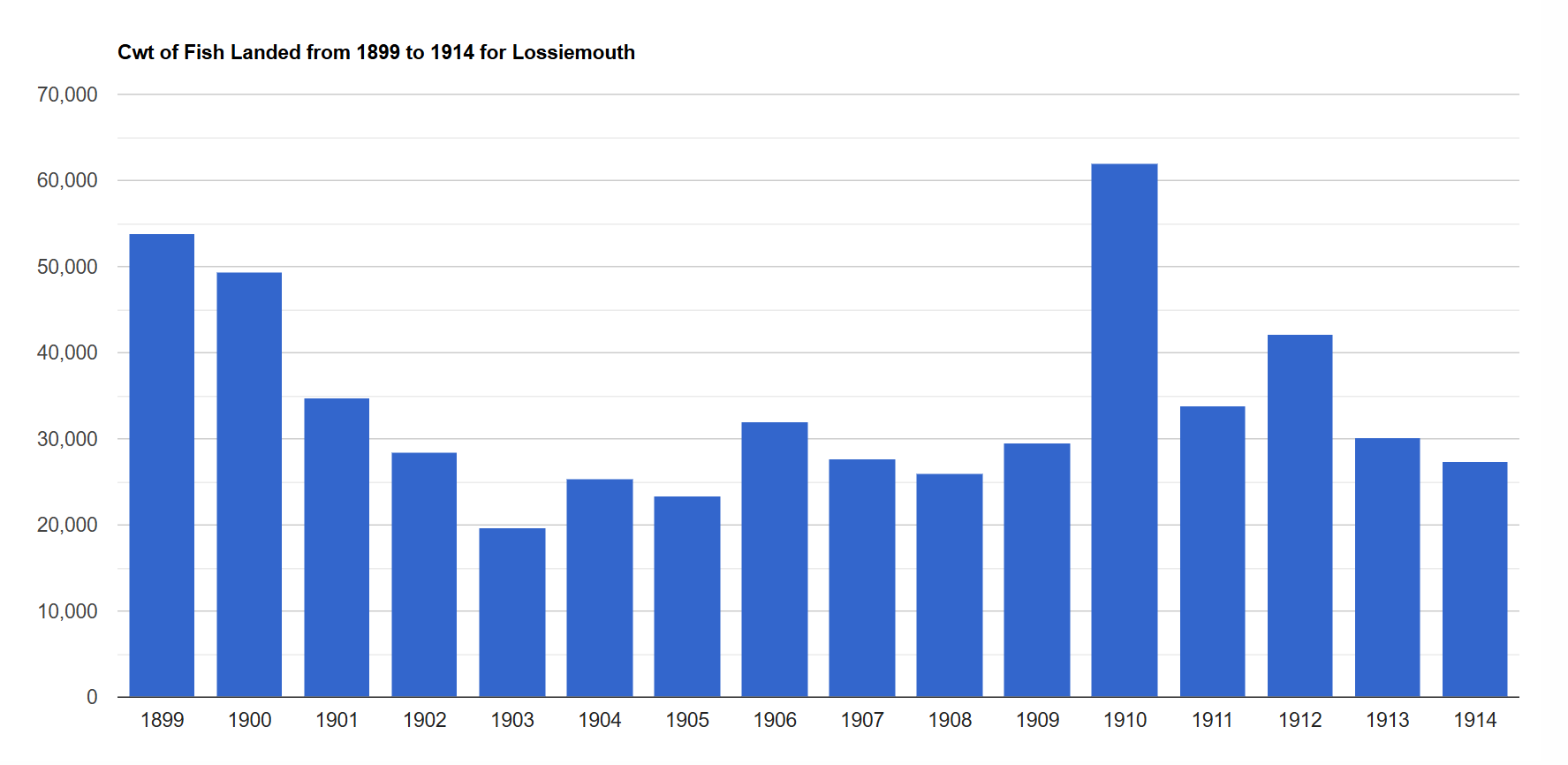
Cwt of fish landed

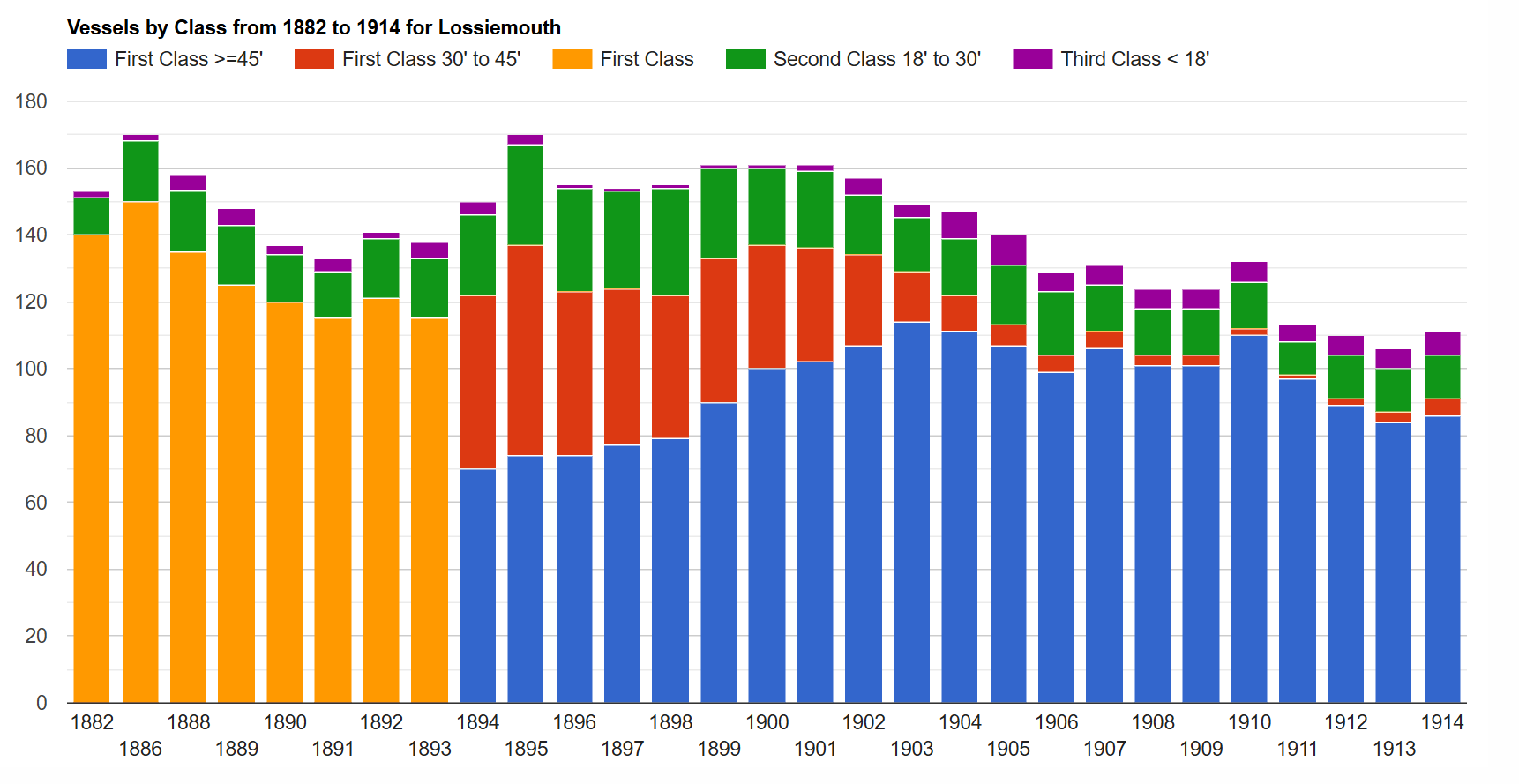
Vessels by class

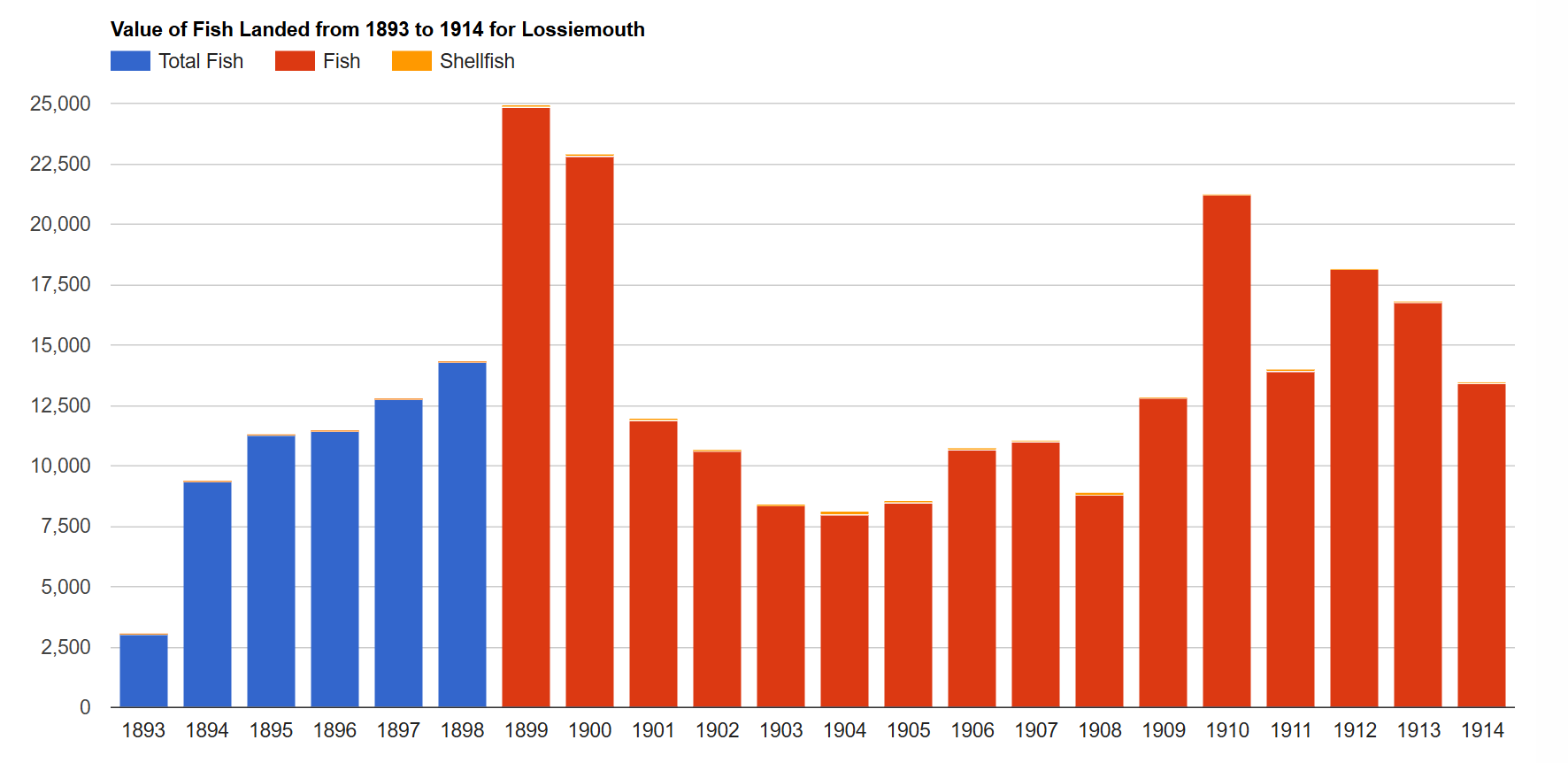
Value (£] of fish landed

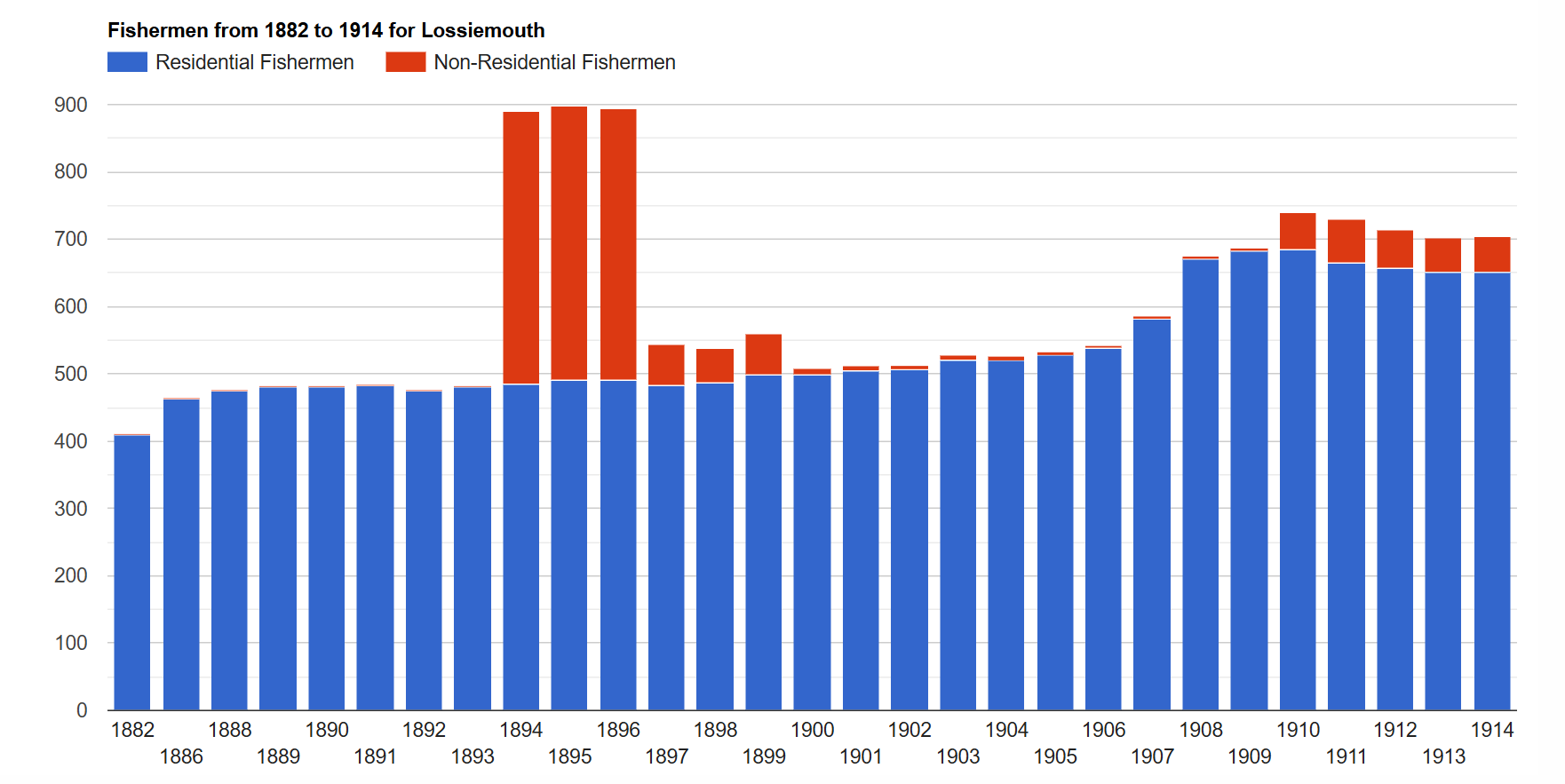
Fishermen

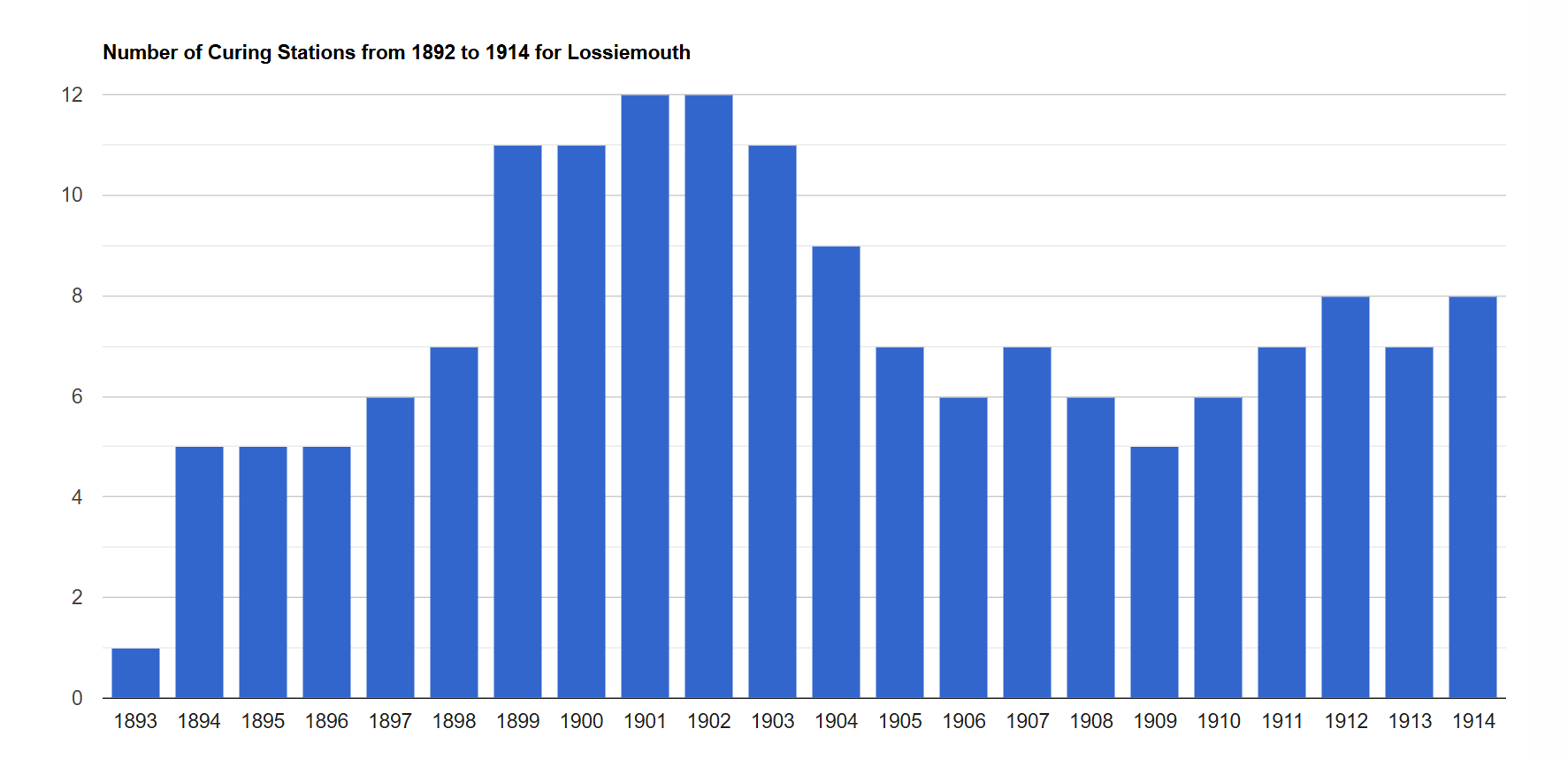
Number of curing stations

==== Morayshire Railway ====
The Morayshire Railway

The Morayshire Railway was officially opened at ceremonies in Elgin and Branderburgh on 10 August 1852, the steam engines having been delivered to Lossie by sea. It was the first railway north of Aberdeen. Initially it went only the 5 1/2 miles (9 km) between Lossie and Elgin, but it was later extended south to Craigellachie. The Lossie–Elgin section had three intermediate stops: the Rifle Range Halt, Greens of Drainie and Linksfield. The Great North of Scotland Railway took over the working of the line in 1863 and bought the company in 1881 following the Morayshire Railway's return from crippling debt back to solvency. The railway and harbour became very important to the economy of both Lossie and Moray. It was the Morayshire Railway that persuaded Col Brander, of Pitgaveny, to build the bridge from the Seatown to the east beach to encourage more day tripping in the summer months.

=== Timeline ===
Dates
Note: From early maps, Stotfield is known to exist in the 16th century (see National Library of Scotland) but is probably older. Kinneddar is referenced in the 10th century.

== Geography, geology and wildlife ==
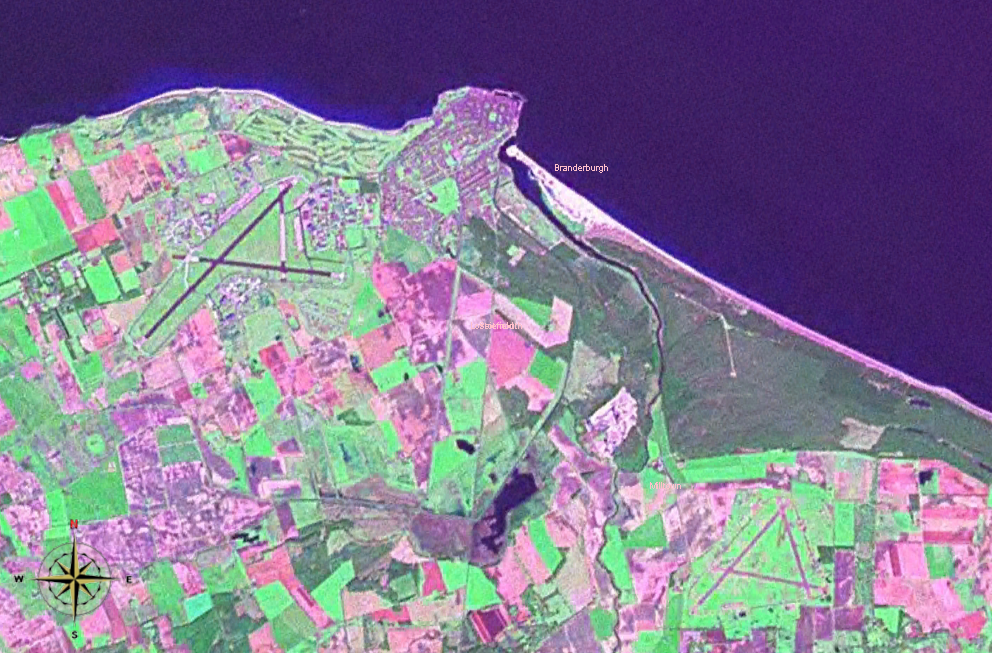
Satellite image of Lossiemouth on the Moray Firth, the River Lossie, Lossie Forest to the SE, RAF Lossiemouth to the SW and the Laich o' Moray to the S.

The town is located on the most northerly point of the south coast of the Moray Firth, at the mouth of the River Lossie. To the west of the town are a sandy beach, golf links and the Royal Air Force station, RAF Lossiemouth. Lossie Forest is a large pine forest that starts on the town's south-east boundary and the river splits it into two sections. The south side of the town is joined by the fertile plains of the Laich o' Moray.

Lossiemouth Beach is a large strip of dunes separated from the rest of the town by the River Lossie, creating a useful sheltered expanse of water. The town looks down onto this natural harbour with a plain promenade street from which the East Beach Bridge leads onto the sands. Ringed plover, grey heron, black-headed gull, oystercatcher, curlew, mallard and other waders feed under the bridge and are easy to watch from the street, and there are vast numbers of water birds in the more rural area further east.

A large part of the town is built on the Coulard Hill which consists of pale grey and yellow sandstones and with these is associated a cherty and calcareous band, known as 'the cherty rock of Stotfield' . This rock is a form of silica that contains micro-crystalline quartz. Also in the calcareous band of the Stotfield rock there is limestone with nodular masses of flint, crystals of galena (lead ore) and iron pyrites. The quarry on the east side of the town that produced the stone for the building of Branderburgh produced the largest variety and total numbers of fossil reptiles from the late Triassic Period to have been found in the UK. This was a total of eight species and 97 individuals; five of the species are unique to Lossiemouth, one of which is an early form of dinosaur. This quarry is ranked as one of Britain's most important fossil bearing locations of this period.

== Climate ==
Climate data for Lossiemouth (6m elevation) 1991–2020
Month	Jan	Feb	Mar	Apr	May	Jun	Jul	Aug	Sep	Oct	Nov	Dec	Year
Mean daily maximum °C (°F)	6.9 (44.4)	7.6 (45.7)	9.3 (48.7)	11.7 (53.1)	14.1 (57.4)	16.3 (61.3)	18.6 (65.5)	18.4 (65.1)	16.3 (61.3)	12.9 (55.2)	9.5 (49.1)	7.1 (44.8)	12.4 (54.3)
Mean daily minimum °C (°F)	0.6 (33.1)	0.8 (33.4)	2.0 (35.6)	3.9 (39.0)	6.2 (43.2)	9.1 (48.4)	10.9 (51.6)	10.7 (51.3)	8.9 (48.0)	5.9 (42.6)	3.0 (37.4)	0.5 (32.9)	5.2 (41.4)
Average rainfall mm (inches)	49.8 (1.96)	45.4 (1.79)	40.2 (1.58)	40.8 (1.61)	50.3 (1.98)	58.4 (2.30)	61.5 (2.42)	68.9 (2.71)	67.2 (2.65)	73.3 (2.89)	61.1 (2.41)	53.7 (2.11)	670.6 (26.40)
Average rainy days (≥ 1.0 mm)	12.0	10.3	10.5	9.6	10.2	11.8	11.3	12.0	11.3	13.0	12.8	12.1	137.0
Source: Met Office

== Demography ==
At the 2022 Scottish census, Lossiemouth had a population of 6,654 inhabitants.

Population

Males:	3476
Females:	3397
Total:	6873

Age structure (%)

0 – 4 years:	5.86
5 – 15 years:	14.62
16 – 24 years:	10.74
25 – 44 years:	32.93
45 – 64 years:	22.03
65 – 74 years:	7.42
75+ years:	6.40

Religion (%)

Church of Scotland:	41.96
Roman Catholic:	5.69
Other Christian:	16.98
Other non-Christian:	0.70
None:	30.21
Not answered:	4.45

Country of birth (%)

Scotland:	73.58
England:	19.83
Wales:	1.63
Other UK:	0.03
Republic of Ireland:	0.25
Other EU:	1.69
Elsewhere:	2.27

Ethnic group (%)

White Scottish:	76.31
Other White British:	21.26
White Irish:	1.08
Other White:	1.08
Indian:	0.12
Pakistani:	0.07
Chinese:	0.10
Caribbean:	0.10
African:	0.07
Black Scottish or Other Black:	0.07
Mixed background:	0.20
Other:	0.12

Source: Moray Council from 2001 Census data

Lossiemouth's population in 1901 was 3904

== Economy ==
Lossiemouth is heavily dependent on the Royal Air Force station for its employment of civilians. In 2005, RAF Lossiemouth along with its neighbour RAF Kinloss contributed £156.5 million (including civilian expenditure) to the Moray economy, of which £76.6 million was retained and spent locally. The bases are responsible for providing, directly or indirectly, 21 per cent of all employment in the area.

Before the RAF, fishing was almost the sole industrialised process in Lossiemouth, but it now contributes very little to the overall economy; in 2001, fishing accounted for 1.62% (55 individuals) of the full-time employment of Lossiemouth. However, some engineering businesses once associated with fishing still exist in the town. Unlike other sizable towns in the area, Lossiemouth has not attracted the large supermarket groups due to its proximity to Elgin, which also provides employment to a significant proportion of the working population.

Source: Highland & Islands Enterprise & Moray Council

== Transport ==
Three roads converge on the town. The A941 connects to Elgin, while the B9103 joins the A96 (main Inverness to Aberdeen route) and the B9040 connects to Hopeman and Burghead. There is a regular bus service to and from Elgin.

The nearest railway station is at Elgin and offers services every 90 to 120 minutes to both Inverness (about 50 minutes travel time) and Aberdeen (about 90 minutes travel time), and onwards to the rest of the UK. The former Morayshire Railway line to Elgin was closed to passenger traffic in 1964 and goods in 1966. The former railway route has been turned into a footpath, and the edge of the station platform is visible in the main car park near the harbour.

There is a frequent bus service from Lossiemouth to Elgin.

Inverness Airport (36 miles / 58 km) and Aberdeen Airport (62 miles / 100 km) offer a wide range of destinations.

== Politics ==
=== National governments ===
- Lossiemouth is in the Moray (Westminster) constituency of the United Kingdom Parliament which returned Douglas Ross as its Member of Parliament (MP) in the last general election.
- Lossiemouth is in the Moray constituency of the Scottish Parliament has slightly different boundaries to the UK Parliament constituency of the same name. It is represented at Holyrood by Richard Lochhead. The town is also part of the Highlands and Islands electoral region.

=== Local government ===
- Lossiemouth is part of the Moray council area and elects its four representatives as part of the Heldon and Laich ward.

== Education ==
=== Primary ===
- St Gerardine’s Primary School
- Hythehill Primary School

=== Secondary ===
- Lossiemouth High School is located in the south west of the town.

=== Further ===
- Ecosse Performers College is located at 56 High Street.

== Religion ==
The following religious denominations have places of worship in Lossiemouth:

Church of Scotland

- St Gerardine's High, Drainie Parish Church, St Gerardines Road
- St James’ Church, Prospect Terrace

United Free Church of Scotland

- United Free Church, St Gerardines Road

Baptist

- Lossiemouth Baptist Church King Street

Plymouth Brethren

- Gospel Hall, James Street

Scottish Episcopal

- St Margaret’s Church, Stotfield Road

Roman Catholic

- St Columba's Church, Union Street

== Culture and leisure ==
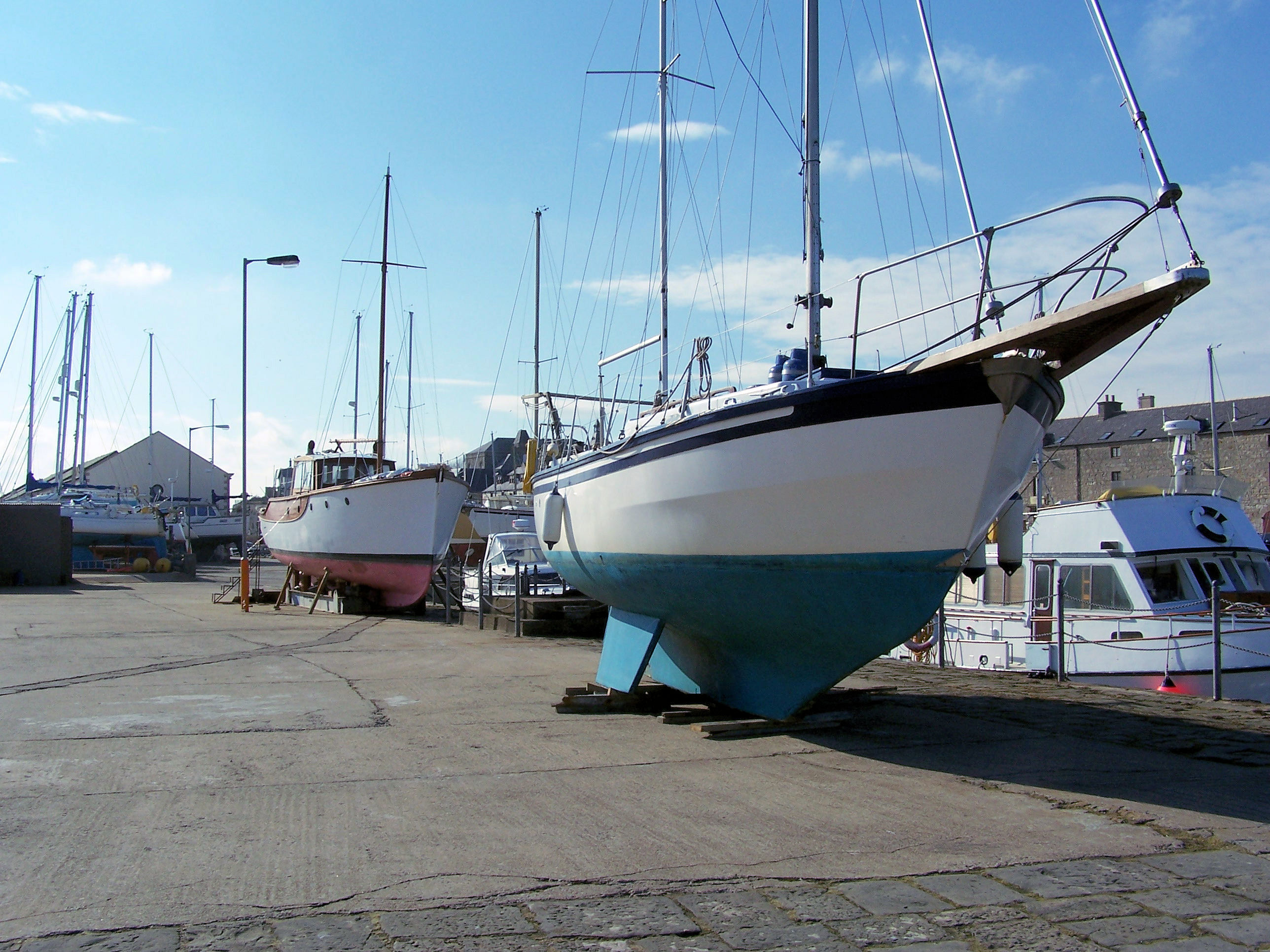
The marina occupying the Old Harbour

- Lossiemouth Cruising Club The Marina, Pitgaveny Quay
- Moray Golf Club, Stotfield Road. The club has two 18 hole courses.
- The Warehouse, Pitgaveny Quay – Small intimate theatre/live music venue
- Lossiemouth Fisheries and Community Museum, Pitgaveny Quay
- Public Library, Town Hall Lane
- Swimming pool, adjacent to Lossiemouth High School
- Covesea Lighthouse off B9040 now owned by Covesea Lighthouse Community Co. Ltd.
- RAF and FAA Heritage Centre at Covesea Lighthouse

== Sport ==
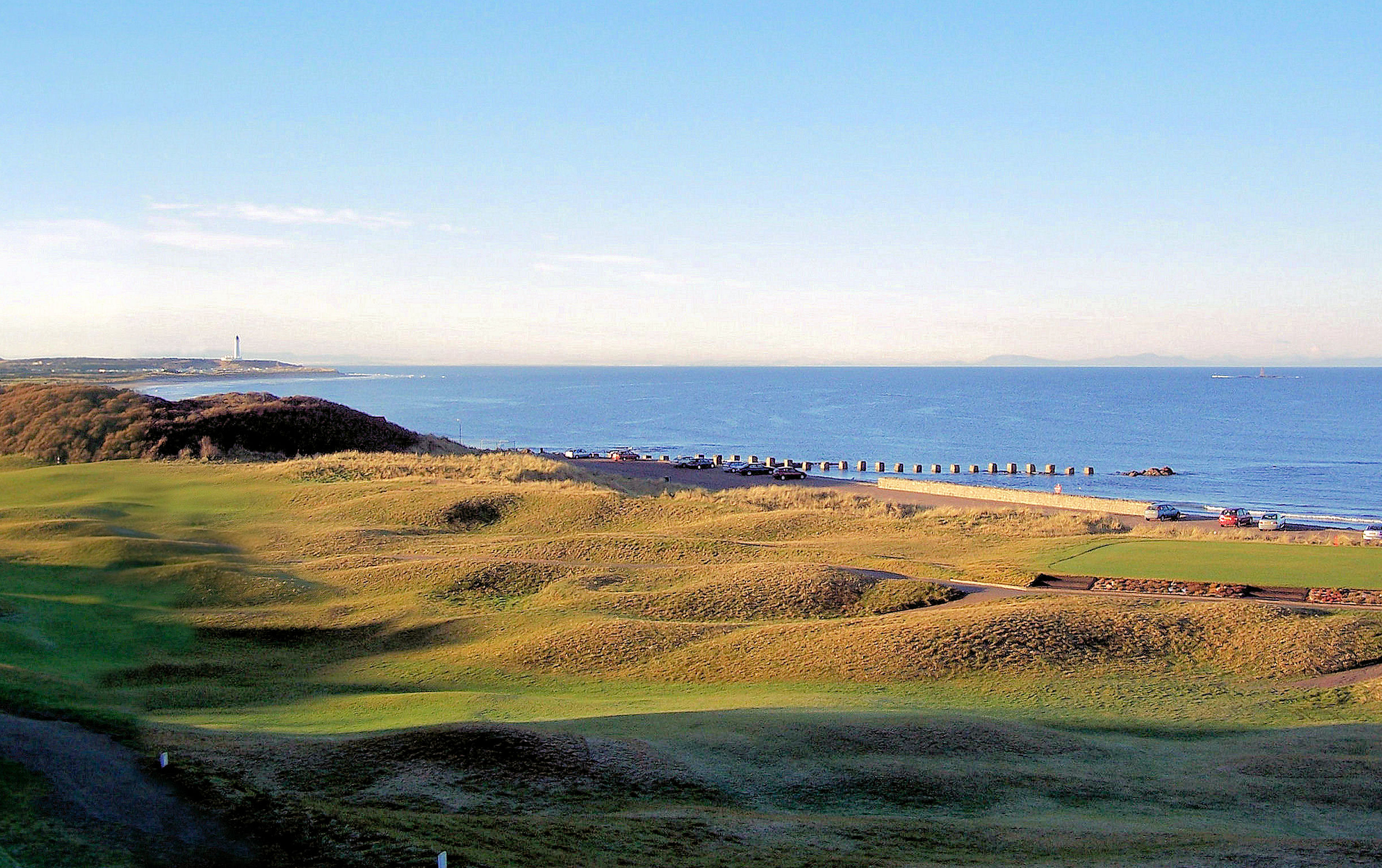
The 18th fairway at Moray golf Club, Lossiemouth

The town's main football club is Lossiemouth F.C., nicknamed "The Coasters", who play in the Highland Football League. The club play their home games at Grant Park. They have won several trophies in recent seasons, including the Highland League Cup and several North of Scotland Cups. The local derby had been against Elgin City FC; however their promotion to the higher Scottish leagues in recent years has reduced the frequency of the matches. The town's junior football club is Lossiemouth United. RAF Lossiemouth also has a junior football club. In addition, the station has a rugby union and a cricket club that play in their respective North of Scotland leagues and a rugby league side that plays in the Scotland Rugby League as the Moray Eels; most station teams also play in their respective RAF competitions. The Moray Golf Club is the town's golf club and has two courses, the "Old Course" established in 1889, designed by Old Tom Morris who predicted that it would become the best in the north, and the 18 hole "New Course", designed by Sir Henry Cotton, opened in 1979.

== Language ==
Lossiemouth, as with all of Moray and almost the entirety of Scotland, was previously Scottish Gaelic speaking. Following the 19th century, the process of Anglicization which had advanced for centuries saw it briefly adopt a dialect of the Scots language – closely related to the Doric dialect that was prevalent in nearby Aberdeenshire – which became dominant before being almost entirely displaced by standard Scottish English.

Many variations of the Doric dialect can be heard along the Grampian coast; identifiable dialects from towns as close as 5 miles (8 km) apart (i.e. Lossiemouth and Hopeman) are not unheard of. Just as the Doric is in decline, however, so it is in Lossiemouth. The reasons for this include the demise of Lossiemouth as a fishing port where its fishermen used Scots extensively. In fishing towns such as Peterhead and Fraserburgh, Scots is still widely spoken. In Lossiemouth, though, the high level of employment at the RAF station and a large population of non-Scots (nearly 25%) has hastened this decline. Quite a lot of the words still remain in use but on the whole, Scottish English is increasingly spoken among the indigenous population.

== Twin town ==
Lossiemouth has been twinned with Hersbruck in Bavaria, Germany since 1972.

== Notable Lossie-ites ==
- James Ramsay MacDonald – first British Labour Prime Minister (1866–1937)
- Malcolm MacDonald – Labour MP, Minister, diplomat and author (1901–1981)
- Sergeant Alexander Edwards – cooper and soldier, recipient of the Victoria Cross (1885–1918)
- Gordon Campbell, Baron Campbell of Croy – soldier, diplomat, Conservative MP, Cabinet Minister and peer (1921–2005)
- Stewart Imlach – professional footballer (1932–2001)
- Alan Main – professional footballer and Scotland goalkeeper
- David West – watercolour artist, gold prospector, sailor (1868–1936)
- Meg Farquhar – first female professional golfer in Britain (1910–1988)
- Jock Garden – Baptist minister, Australian politician and founder member of Australian Communist Party (1882–1968)
- George Fraser – leading hybridiser of rhododendrons in British Columbia, Canada
- Sir Alex Smith – former Head of Advanced Research, Rolls-Royce (1922 – 28 February 2003)
- Peter Kerr – jazz musician, farmer, record producer and author
- Reverend Lewis Gordon (c.1750-c.1820) Moderator of the General Assembly of the Church of Scotland in 1815

== Snippets ==
Two Royal Navy vessels, both named after the River Lossie, were involved in rescues following torpedo sinkings during the Second World War.

- HMS Lossie, a River class frigate, was patrolling in the Indian Ocean. On 29 June 1944, the freighter Nellore was sunk and a week later HMS Lossie picked up 112 crewmen including the captain near the Chagos Archipelago and landed them at Addu Atoll.
- HMS River Lossie (requisitioned Aberdeen drifter A332) picked up the master and 41 crew members of the merchant ship Cairnmona off Rattray Head on 30 October 1939 after she was sunk by a German U-boat while in a convoy bound from Montreal to Leith and Newcastle.

Lossiemouth was mentioned in Yes, Prime Minister; character Bernard Woolley thought it was a type of dog food.

== Footnotes ==
- Source for money calculations
