= River Lossie =

River in Moray, Scotland

Coordinates: 57°43′N 3°16′W

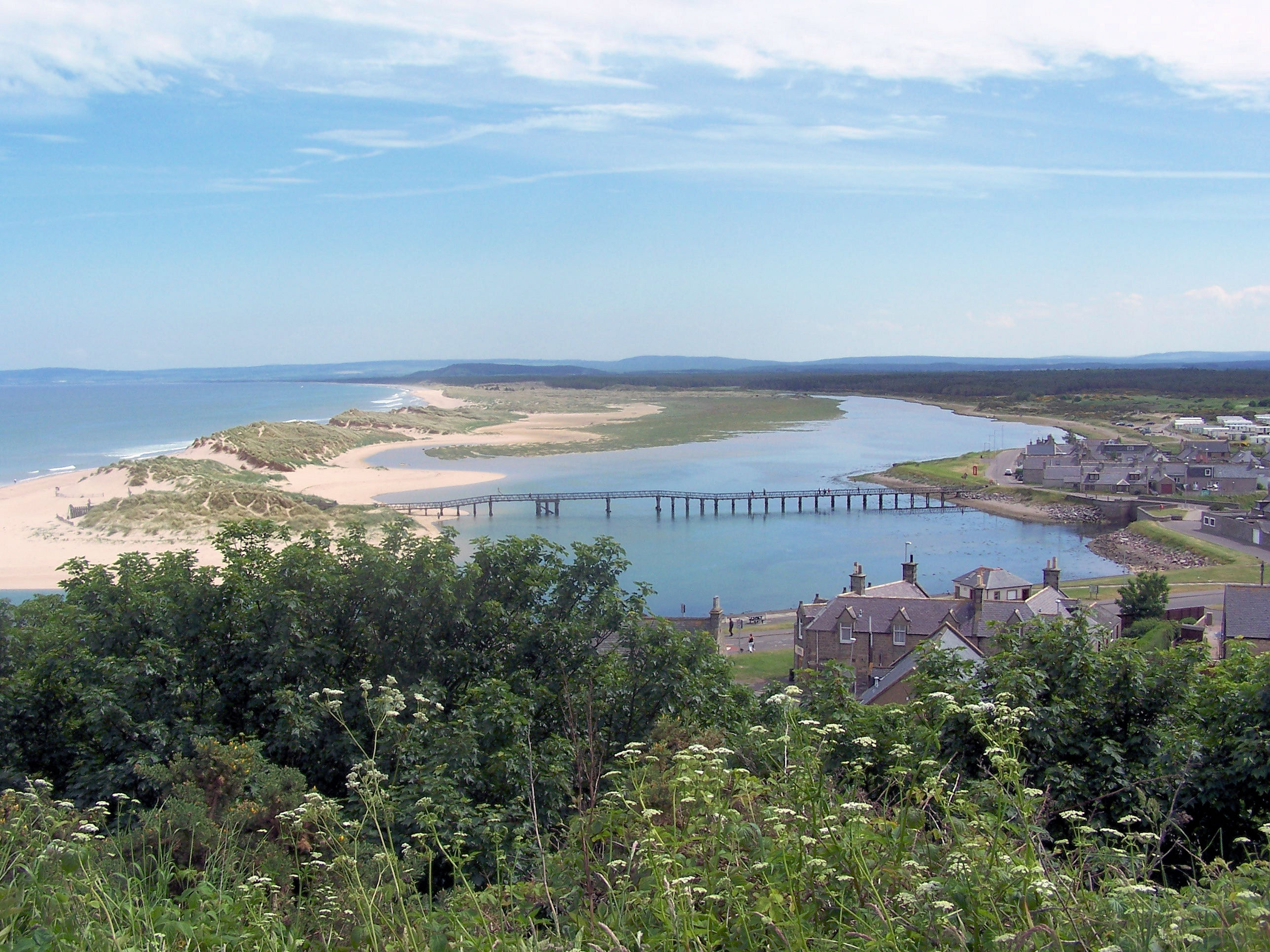

Location
- Country: Scotland

Physical characteristics
- Source
  - location: Hills above Dallas, Moray
  - elevation: 400 m (1,300 ft)
- Mouth
  - location: Lossiemouth into Moray Firth
- Length: 50 km (31 mi)
- Basin size: 213 km^{2} (82 sq mi)
- Discharge
  - average: 5 m^{3}/s (180 cu ft/s)

The River Lossie (Scottish Gaelic: Uisge Losaidh) is a river in north east Scotland. The river originates in the hills above Dallas, in Moray, and has its source 400 metres (1,300 ft) above sea-level. It enters the sea at Lossiemouth on the Moray Firth. By the time it moves through Elgin its rate of flow, in normal conditions, is best described as very slow. The gradient between Elgin and Lossiemouth is almost imperceptible with a total fall of less than 5 metres (16 ft).

== Name and etymology ==
The hydronym Lossie was recorded either as Loscyn or Lostyn in 1189, and may be of Pictish origin. The ending -yn represents -in, a Pictish form of the Welsh suffix yn. The first element may be a cognate either of Welsh llost meaning "tail, spear", or llosg meaning "burning".

The Lossie has been identified with the Loksa recorded by Ptolemy, although River Findhorn is a more likely candidate for such identification.

== Settlements ==
(from south to north)

- Dallas
- Kellas
- Paddockhaugh
- Pittendreich
- Elgin
- Calcots
- Lossiemouth (East Beach Bridge)
