= Index of fishing articles =

This page is a list of fishing topics.

== 0–9 ==
1959 Escuminac Hurricane - 2004 Morecambe Bay cockling disaster

== A ==
A Pobra do Caramiñal - A River Somewhere - Abalone - ABU Garcia - Age class structure - Agriculture in Libya - Agriculture, Fisheries and Conservation Department - Agulhas Bank - Akebono Maru - Alaskan king crab fishing - Alexander Neil McLean - Algaculture - Algal bloom - Allan M.A. McLean - Ama divers - Amadou - American Angler - American Angler - American lobster - List of American fishers - American Museum of Fly Fishing - American plaice - Amwell Magna Fishery - Anchovy - Ancient Hawaiian aquaculture - Andrea Gail - Androscoggin River - Angling - Angling in Yellowstone National Park - Angling records in the UK - Angling records of Europe - Anguillidae - Animas River - Aquaculture - Aquaculture engineering - Aquaponics - Aquatic ecosystem - Arctic char - Arctic Corsair - Arctic grayling - Argungu Fishing Festival - Arizona Game and Fish Department - Arkansas River - Arlesey Bomb - Artificial fly - Asia-Pacific Fishery Commission (APFIC) - Astacus astacus - Atlantic cod - Atlantic cod - Atlantic herring - Atlantic salmon - Atlantic salmon - Atlantic Spanish mackerel - Atlantic surf clam - Atlantic tarpon - Atlantic white shrimp - Austevoll Municipality - Australian salmon

== B ==
B. H. Fisher - Bag limits - Bait Act - Bait fish - Bamboo fly rod - Bangladesh Marine Fisheries Academy - Bank fishing - Banks dory - Basa fish - Basnig - Bass Anglers Sportsman Society - Bass boat - Bass Festival - Bass fishing - Bassmaster Classic - Bay mud - Bayou La Batre, Alabama - Beach casting - Bennett Spring State Park - Benthic zone - Benthos - Bering Sea Arbitration - Best Angler ESPY Award - Bibliography of fly fishing - Big Hole River - Big-game fishing - Billingsgate Fish Market - Bioeconomics - Bioluminescence - Biomass (ecology) - Bite alarm - Blast fishing - Blast fishing - Blue cod - Blue grenadier - Blue mussel - Bluefish - Bobs Farm, New South Wales - Boilie - Bombarda - Bonefish - Bottom feeder - Bottom fishing - Bottom trawling - Bowfishing - Braided fishing line - Brixham - Broodstock - Brook trout - Brown trout - Bruno Hofer - Bureau of Fisheries and Aquatic Resources (Philippines) - Busan Cooperative Fish Market - Büsum - By-catch

== C ==
Cadgwith - Callinectes sapidus – Callum Roberts - Calypso (ship) - Canadian Senate Standing Committee on Fisheries and Oceans - Cape D'Aguilar Marine Reserve - Cape Islander - Capelin - Carp - Cast net - Casting (fishing) - Catch and release - Catch reporting - Catfish - Catskill Fly Fishing Center and Museum - Central Marine Fisheries Research Institute - Centre for Environment, Fisheries and Aquaculture Science - Centre of Marine Resource Management - Cetacean bycatch - Chasse-marée - Chatham Rise - Chinese fishing nets - Chris Yates (fisherman) - Circle hook - Clam - Clam digging - Clouser Deep Minnow - Coarse fishing - Cobia - Coble - Cockle (bivalve) - Cod - Cod liver oil - Cod Wars - Coho salmon - Coleman National Fish Hatchery - Commercial fishing - Commercial fishing in Alaska - Commercial trawler - Common cockle - Common Fisheries Policy - Common periwinkle - Common snook - Conch - Concholepas concholepas - Connecticut River - Continental shelf - Continental shelf pump - Coral reef - Corf - Cormorant fishing - Couta - Crab - Crangon crangon - Crappie - Crayfish - CSIRO Marine and Atmospheric Research - Cul de canard - Cullercoats - Culture of Póvoa de Varzim - Currach - Cusk (fish) - Cutthroat trout - Cuttlefish - Cuttyhunk - Cyanide fishing

== D ==
Daigo Fukuryū Maru - Daniel Pauly - Dar es Salaam Marine Reserve - Dead zone (ecology) - Deadsticking - Department for Environment, Food and Rural Affairs - Department of Agriculture, Fisheries and Forestry (Australia) - DePuy Spring Creek - Dexter National Fish Hatchery & Technology Center - Dianna Clark - Diawl bach - Discards - Dogger Bank - Dolphin safe label - Domstein - Dongwon-ho 628 - Dory - Double-Heart of Stacked Stones - Downrigger - Dried and salted cod - Dried shrimp - Drift net - Drifter (fishing boat) - Dropline - Dungeness crab - Dworshak National Fish Hatchery

== E ==
East Gallatin River - Eastern oyster - Ecology of the San Francisco Estuary low salinity zone - EconMult - Economy of the Falkland Islands - EconSimp - Ed Ricketts - Edible crab - Edward vom Hofe - Eel - Eel life history - Egg sucking leech - Electrofishing - Environmental effects of fishing - Estuary - European anchovy - European Fishery MLS - European plaice - Eutrophication - Exclusive Economic Zone - Eyemouth - Eyemouth disaster

== F ==
Factory ship - Farley Boats - Farm-Raised Catfish - Fécamp - Felucca - Feskekôrka - Field & Stream - Fifie - Firehole River - Fish - Fish (food) - Fish aggregating device - Fish and Game New Zealand - Fish emulsion - Fish farming - Fish flake - Fish hatchery - Fish hook - Fish hydrolysate - Fish in Australia - Fish market - Fish meal - Fish measurement - Fish migration - Fish oil - Fish preservation - Fish processing - Fish processing facility - Fish product sales - Fish products - Fish sauce - Fish stock - Fish stocking - Fish trap - Fish wheel - Fisheries and Oceans Canada - Fisheries management - Fisheries Research Services - Fisheries Research Services Marine Laboratory - Fisheries science - Fisherman - Fishermen's Union Trading Co. - Fishery - Fishery Resources Monitoring System - Fishfinder - Fishing - Fishing bait - Fishing by country - Fishing communities in Maharashtra - Fishing fleet - Fishing in Alabama - Fishing in Angola - Fishing in Bangladesh - Fishing in Chad - Fishing in Chile - Fishing in Ethiopia - Fishing in Ghana - Fishing in India - Fishing in Ohio - Fishing in the North Sea - Fishing in Uganda - Fishing in Wyoming - Fishing industry - Fishing industry in Canada - Fishing industry in China - Fishing industry in New Zealand - Fishing industry in Russia - Fishing industry in Scotland - Fishing industry in the United States - Fishing light attractor - Fishing line - Fishing lure - Fishing net - Fishing reel - Fishing rod - Fishing rod tapers - Fishing sinker - Fishing swivel - Fishing tackle - Fishing techniques - Fishing tournament - Fishing vessel - Fishing weir - Flatfish - Fleetwood - Flemish Cap - Flesh Fly (Fly-Fishing) - Float (fishing) - Florida stone crab - Flosser - Flounder - Flounder boat - Flounder tramping - Fly fishing - Fly lure - Fly rod building - Fly Tyer - Fly tying - Food and Agriculture Organization - Food of the Tlingit - Forage fish - Fort Frances Canadian Bass Championship - Frank Mundus - Freshwater prawn farm - Fulton Fish Market - Fur-Fish-Game - FV Cornelia Marie - FV Northwestern - FV Wizard

== G ==
Gaff (fishing) - Galápagos Marine Reserve - Galway Hooker - Game fish - Garum - Gathering seafood by hand - Gazela - Geoduck - Georg Ossian Sars - George F. Grant - George Poveromo - George Sleight - Georges Bank - Geothermal energy and aquaculture - Ghost net - Giant gourami - Giant river prawn - Gibbon River - Gigging - Gilleleje - Gillnet - Glass float - Global Ocean Ecosystem Dynamics (GLOBEC) - Golden North Salmon Derby - Golden Triangle (Rocky Mountains) - Golden trout - Gotthilf Hempel - Grand Banks - Grayling (species) - Gray's Sporting Journal - Green abalone - Green ormer - Grey Nurse shark conservation - Grieg Seafood - Groundbait - Groundfish - Gulf States Marine Fisheries Commission - Gunnison River - Gyre

== H ==
Haddock - Haenyo - Hair rig - Halibut - Halibut Treaty - Haliotis corrugata - Hand-line fishing - Hand net - Harald Rosenthal - Hard clam - Hare's Ear - Harkers Island, North Carolina - Harold Innis and the cod fishery - Harpoon - Hastings & St. Leonards Angling Association - Hastings & St.Leonards Angling Association - Hawaiian sling - Hawkins Bank - Herring - Herring Buss - Hickory Shad - Hilsa - Hip boot - Hirudiculture - History of fishing - History of research ships - Hol Chan Marine Reserve - Homarus gammarus - Hookset - Hovden, Nordland - Howard Marshall (broadcaster) - Hucho taimen - Hugh Falkus - Humboldt Current - Hunting and fishing in Alaska

== I ==
Ice fishing - Ike jime - Illegal, unreported and unregulated fishing - Incidental mortality - Indian prawn - Individual fishing quota - Individual Transferable Quota - Industries in Maldives - Infectious Hypodermal and Hematopoietic Necrosis - Inkfish - Inland saline aquaculture - Integrated Multi-Trophic Aquaculture - International Collective in Support of Fishworkers - International Commission for the Conservation of Atlantic Tunas - International Council for the Exploration of the Sea - International Game Fish Association - International Land-Based Shark Fishing Association - International Whaling Commission - Intertidal ecology - Iridescent shark - Irish Conservation Box - Isinglass

== J ==
Jack Gartside - Jackson National Fish Hatchery - Jacksonville Kingfish Tournament - Jagalchi Market - Jangada - Japanese butterfish - Jason Holmer - Jasus - Jasus lalandii - Jesús Vidaña - Jig (fishing) - Johan Hjort - John Dietsch - John Dietsch - John Dory - John Gierach - John Wilson (angler)

== K ==
Kaj Busch - Kapenta - Kayak fishing - Kelong - Kelp forest - Kevin VanDam - Killybegs - King mackerel - Kirk Lombard - Kjell Inge Røkke - Klinkhammer - Kolae boat - Kolis - Krill - Krill fishery

== L ==
L'Acadien II - Lampricide - Lampuki netting - Land-based shark fishing - Largemouth bass - Larry Larsen - Leo Margolis - Lerøy - Les Anderson (fisher) - Lightning whelk - Lindy Legendary Fishing Tackle - List of National Fish Hatcheries in the United States - List of research vessels by country - Little Cleo - Littoral zone - Live food fish trade - Lobster - Lobster fishing - Lobster hook - Lobster trap - Longear sunfish - Longline fishing - Lophius - Lossiemouth - Lou de Palingboer - Lowestoft - Lugger - Luke Clausen - Luzzu

== M ==
Macassan contact with Australia - Macclesfield Bank - Mackerel - Mackinaw boat - Madison River - Mahimahi - Maine Avenue Fish Market - Maja squinado - Mantis shrimp - Maori cod - Mariculture - Marine and Fisheries Agency - Marine conservation - Marine conservation activism - Marine debris - Marine Fisheries Department - Marine Harvest - Marine Institute Ireland - Marine pollution - Marine Protected Area - Marine reserve - Marine snow - Marine Stewardship Council - Marlin - Marlin fishing - Maszoperia - Matthew Hayes - Maximum sustainable yield in fisheries - Mazara del Vallo - McKenzie River dory - Merchant Shipping (Scottish Fishing Boats) Act 1920 - Merlangius merlangus - Mevagissey - Michael Iaconelli - Mick Brown (angler) - Midwater trawling - Migratory Fishery of Labrador - Minister for Agriculture, Food and the Marine - Ministry of Agriculture, Fisheries and Food (United Kingdom) - Ministry of Agriculture, Forestry and Fisheries (Japan) - Ministry of Agriculture, Nature and Food Quality (Netherlands) - Ministry of Fisheries (New Zealand) - Miramichi River - Misgurnus anguillicaudatus - Mogaveeras - Monitoring control and surveillance - Monterey clipper - Mora National Fish Hatchery and Technology Center - Moray Firth fishing disaster - Mormyshka - Mossom Creek Hatchery - Muddler Minnow - Multifilament fishing line - Munster pilchard fishery 1570-1750 - Mussel - Mytilidae

== N ==
Natchitoches National Fish Hatchery - National Agronomy and Fishing Investigation Institute - National Coalition for Marine Conservation - National Fish Hatchery System - National Fisheries Research & Development Institute - Nazareth Bank - Neritic zone - Net casting - New Zealand green-lipped mussel - New Zealand sea urchin - Newlyn - Newlyn riots - Nisshin Maru - Nof Ginnosar - Noodling - Nordland (boat) - North American Native Fishes Association - North Atlantic Marine Mammal Commission - North Pacific Longliners Association - North Shields - Northern pike - Northern snakehead - Northwest Atlantic Fisheries Organization - Norway lobster - Norwegian College of Fishery Science - Norwegian Institute of Marine Research - Norwegian Ministry of Fisheries and Coastal Affairs - Noryangjin Fisheries Wholesale Market

== O ==
O. Mustad & Son - Ocean fisheries - Ocean acidification - Octopus - Olympia oyster - Open Hall-Red Cliffe, Newfoundland and Labrador - Operation liberty (fishing) - Optimum sustainable yield in fisheries - Orange roughy - Original Floater - Orvis - Ostrea angasi - Outdoor Life - Overfishing - Oyster - Oyster farming - Oyster pirate

== P ==
Pacific cod - Pacific herring - Pacific oyster - Pacific saury - Pacific Whiting Conservation Cooperative - Pair trawling - Palinurus elephas - Pandalus borealis - Panfish - Papa Stour - Paralithodes camtschaticus - Paravane (water kite) - Patagonian toothfish - Paul Schwinghammer - Payaos - Peacock bass - Pearl hunting - Pectin novaezealandiae - Pelagic Ecology of the Low Salinity San Francisco Estuary - Pelagic zone - Pelican (Fishing Vessel) - Pelican, Alaska - Pellet waggler - Penaeus monodon - Penns Creek - Pentti Linkola - Perhentian Islands - Permit (fish) - Perna perna - Perna viridis - Pheasant Tail Nymph - Phil Bolger - Phu Quy - Pink salmon - Piracema - Pirogue - Piscicide - Pittenweem - Placunidae - Plastic bait - Plastic worm - Plebidonax deltoides - Plug (fishing) - Polespear - Pollock - Polperro - Population dynamics - Population dynamics of fisheries - Portland, Maine - Portunus pelagicus - Portunus trituberculatus - Power pro - Priest (tool) - Princes Street Market (Cork) - Project AWARE - Puget Sound environmental issues

== Q ==
Quiver tip

== R ==
R. J. McKay - Raceway (aquaculture) - Rainbow trout - Rapala - Reach cast - Recreational fishing - Recreational boat fishing - Red abalone - Red drum - Red snapper (fish) - Red tide - Redbreast sunfish - Redeye bass - Redmire pool - Reedville, Virginia - Reef aquarium - Reginald Beddington - Research vessel - Rex Hunt - RIA1 - Richard Walker (angler) - Rick Clunn - Rinovia Steam Fishing Company Ltd. - Rio Grande - Rock fishing - Rock salmon - Rough fish - Royal fish - Ruby River - Rusnė - Russian sturgeon

== S ==
Sabiki - Salmon - Salt Water Sportsman - San Juan River (Colorado River) - Sand whiting - Sandsinker - Sardine - Sardine run - Sardinella tawilis - Saya de Malha Bank - Scallop - Scallop dredge - Scottish east coast fishery - Scottish Fisheries Museum - Scottish Fisheries Protection Agency - Scrod - Scylla paramamosain - Scylla serrata - Sea Around Us Project - Sea cucumber - Sea Fish Industry Authority - Sea louse - Sea Shepherd Conservation Society - Sea urchin - Seabed - Seafood - Seamount - Seine fishing - Shad - Shanghai Fisheries University - Shark Alliance - Shark fin soup - Shark liver oil - Sheridan Anderson - Sheringham - Shetland bus - Shifting baseline - Shoal bass - Shortfloating - Shrimp - Shrimp farm - Shrimp marketing - Shrimp paste - Silver carp - Sites of International Whaling Commission annual meetings - Sixareen - Skeet Reese - Skipjack tuna - Slender rainbow sardine - Slurry ice - Smack (ship) - Smallmouth bass - Smelts - Snakeskin gourami - Snapper - Sockeye salmon - Soft plastic - Soft-shell clam - Soft-shell crab - Sole (fish) - Solway Harvester - Sørvágur - Soudan Banks - South East Atlantic Fisheries Organisation - Southeast Asian Fisheries Development Center - Southern rock lobster - Spearfishing - Speargun - Spin fishing - Spinnerbait - Spiny lobster - Spoon lure - Spoonplug - Sport Fishing and Boating Partnership Council - Sports Afield - Spotted bass - Spotted seatrout - Squat lobster - Squid - Squilla mantis - ST Leukos - St. Abbs - St. Abbs and Eyemouth Voluntary Marine Reserve - Stanley (boat) - Stephen Bowen (biologist) - Steven C. Hackett - Steveston, British Columbia - Stockfish - Stotfield fishing disaster - Streaked Spanish mackerel - Striped bass - Striped bass fishing - Sturgeon - Surf fishing - Surface lure - Surrounding net - Sustainable yield in fisheries - Swarm - Sydney rock oyster

== T ==
Tag and release - Tailwater - Tasmanian Seamounts Marine Reserve - Taura syndrome - Tenkara fishing - Tench - Tennessee Wildlife Resources Agency - Tetraodontidae - Texas Rig - TFM (piscicide) - The End of the Line: How Overfishing Is Changing the World and What We Eat - The Field (magazine) - The Golden Mile (Angling) - The Sea of Galilee Boat - The Terror (boat) - Thomas Tod Stoddart - Thresher shark - Tilapia - Tilapia in aquaculture - Tilefish - Tilting, Newfoundland and Labrador - Topwater fishing lure - Tore Schweder - Tragedy of the commons - Trawling - Trident - Troll (angling) - Trolling tandem streamer fly - Trotline - Trout bum - Trout tickling - Troutmasters - Tullaghmurray Lass - Tuna - Turbot - Turbot War - Turtle excluder device

== U ==
U.S. Regional Fishery Management Councils - United States Fish Commission - Unsustainable fishing methods - Upwelling

== V ==
Venus Bay, South Australia - Vessel monitoring system - Virtual Population Analysis

== W ==
Waders (footwear) - Wagenya - Walleye - Walther Herwig - Welaka National Fish Hatchery - Western rock lobster - Whaler - Whaling - Whelk - Whitby - Whitby Seafoods Ltd - White bass - White spot syndrome - White sturgeon - Whitebait - Whiteleg shrimp - Wild fisheries - Wolf Creek National Fish Hatchery - Woolly Bugger - Woolly Worm (imitation) - Work in Fishing Convention 2007 - World fish production - World fisheries - World Fishing Exhibition - World Forum of Fish Harvesters and Fish Workers - World Oceans Day - WorldFish Center - Worm charming

== Y ==
Yabbying - Yakima Klickitat Fisheries Project - Yawl - Yellowfin tuna - Yellowhead disease - Yellowstone cutthroat trout - Yellowstone River - Yellowtail snapper - Yoal

== Z ==
Zara Spook
