= Klinkhamer =

Klinkhamer is a Dutch occupational surname for a blacksmith. Notable people with this name include:

- Adriënne Broeckman-Klinkhamer (1876–1976), Dutch painter, illustrator, and textile artist
- Jacob Frederik Klinkhamer (1854–1928), Dutch architect
- Richard Klinkhamer (1937–2016), Dutch murderer

The Klinkhammer Special is a type of artificial fly tied in an emerger style.
