= Deadstick =

Deadstick may refer to:

- Deadstick landing, when an aircraft loses all of its propulsive power and is forced to land
- Deadsticking, the act of presenting a soft plastic lure in fishing
- Deadstick (single), a single by King Gizzard and the Lizard Wizard that revolves around a deadstick landing
- Operation Deadstick, an erroneous name used for the capture of the Caen canal and Orne river bridges during the Second World War's Normandy landings
