= Anne Marinus Broeckman =

Dutch artist

- Born: 1 March 1874; Amsterdam, the Netherlands
- Died: 19 August 1946 (aged 72); Laren, The Netherlands
- Known for: painter
- Spouse: Adriënne Broeckman-Klinkhamer

Anne Marinus Broeckman (1874–1946) was a Dutch painter.

== Biography ==
Broeckman was born on 1 March 1874 in Amsterdam. He was a student of Karel Alexander August Jan Boom and Gerrit Willem Dijsselhof. Around 1908 he married fellow artist Adriënne Broeckman-Klinkhamer (1876–1976) with whom he had two children, one of whom, Elga Eymer, went on to become an artist. The couple settled in Laren in North Holland.

Broeckman's work was included in the 1939 exhibition and sale Onze Kunst van Heden (Our Art of Today) at the Rijksmuseum in Amsterdam.

Broekman died on 19 August 1946 in Laren.
