= Stephen Bowen =

Stephen Bowen is the name of:

- Stephen Bowen (American football) (born 1984), African-american professional football player
- Stephen Bowen (astronaut) (born 1964), American astronaut
- Stephen Bowen (biologist), American fish biologist, Dean and CEO of Oxford College of Emory University
- Stephen Bowen (politician) (born 1969), American politician from Maine
