= Pellet waggler =

Small, dumpy, float used for fishing

Pellet waggler float made by the J-Range company

A pellet waggler is a small, dumpy float used for fishing. It is suited for any small particle baits, but can also be used for larger baits such as cut cubes of meat. Its main use is to present a bait near the surface of the water, usually in the top 60 cm. When fishing deeper than 60 cm it is better to fish with a normal waggler.

== Use of the float ==
The pellet waggler is mainly used in fishing for carp during warmer months. It is a float fishing technique that relies on the use of heavy loose feeding of particles to bring the fish in to the area of the suspended bait. It was originally designed to be used with hard particle baits such as trout pellets rather than the softer boilie type baits which are fished using a hair rig. The best bait for this style of fishing is sinking pellets of between 4 mm and 10 mm, depending upon the distance that they need feeding using a hook attachment such as bait-fix.

Unlike the hair rig where the bait is attached to the hook by a hair tied on to the hook, this rig uses a small rubber band attached to the hair, which is used to secure the bait.

Recent modifications to the float include the addition of dart like flights to the top of the float ensuring the float flies straighter when cast over long distances. Another new addition is a washer around the base of the float to stop the float diving under the surface of the water, this is very important when carp are feeding near the surface, as a pellet waggler that dives deep below the surface will scare them.
