= Coarse fishing =

Type of freshwater angling in the United Kingdom and Ireland

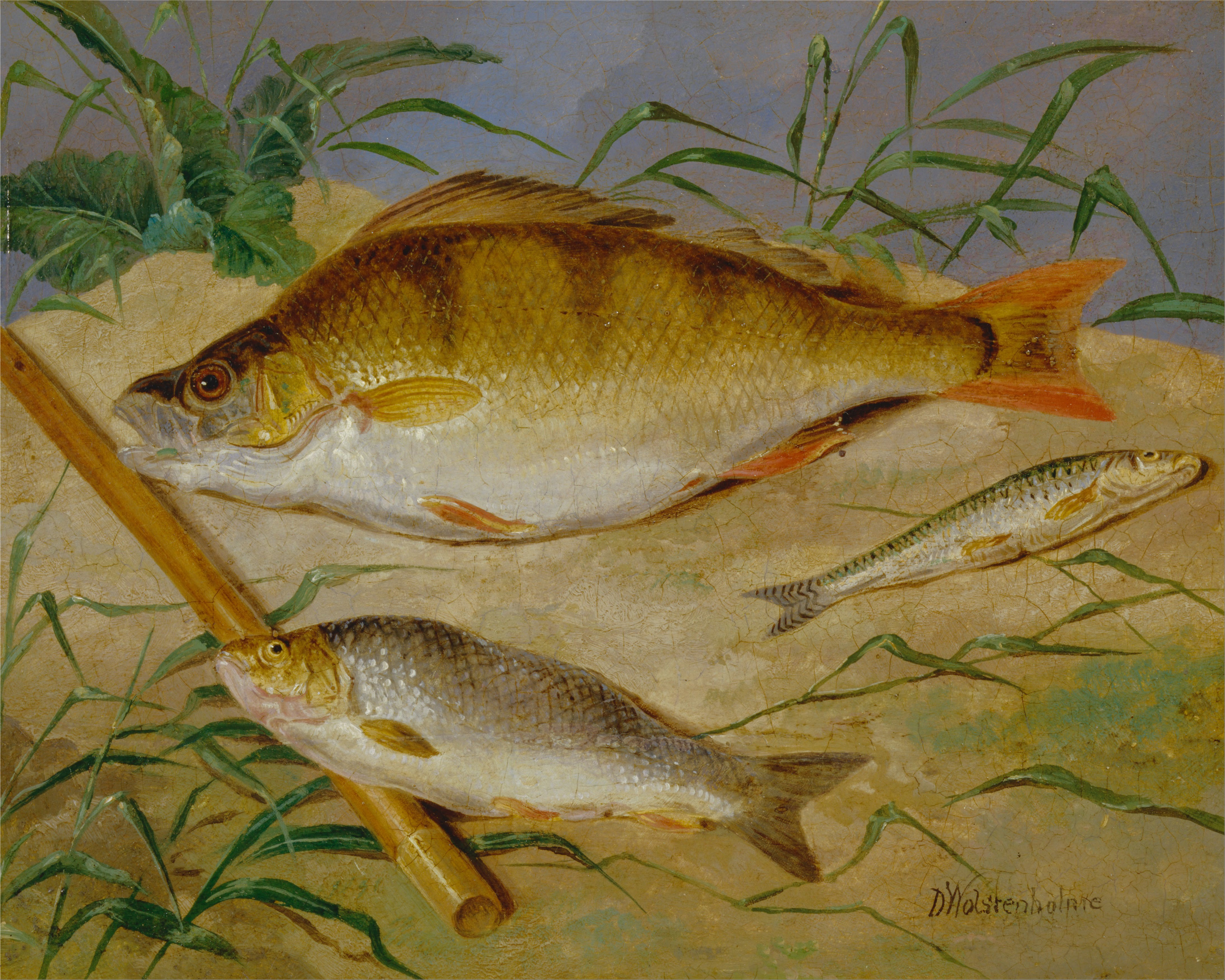
An angler's catch of coarse fish—painting by Dean Wolstenholme, circa 1850

Coarse fishing (Irish: garbhiascaireacht, Welsh: pysgota bras) is a phrase commonly used in Great Britain and Ireland. It refers to the angling for rough fish, which are fish species considered undesirable as food or game fish. Freshwater game fish are all salmonids, particularly salmon, trout and char. Generally, coarse fish are freshwater fish that are not salmonids, though there is often disagreement over whether grayling should be classified as a game fish or a coarse fish.

Fly fishing is the technique usually used for freshwater game fishing, while other angling techniques are usually used for coarse fishing. The sport of coarse fishing and its techniques are particularly popular in the United Kingdom and mainland Europe, as well as in some former British Commonwealth countries and among British expatriates.

The distinction between coarse fish and game fish, terms that developed in the United Kingdom in the early 19th century, has no taxonomic basis. Before that time, recreational fishing was a sport of the gentry, who angled for salmon and trout and called them "game fish". There was a view that other fish did not make as good eating, and they were disdained as coarse fish. Coarse fish have scales that are generally larger than the scales of game fish, and tend to inhabit warmer and stiller waters.

== Bait ==
Coarse fish usually have coarser scales than game fish

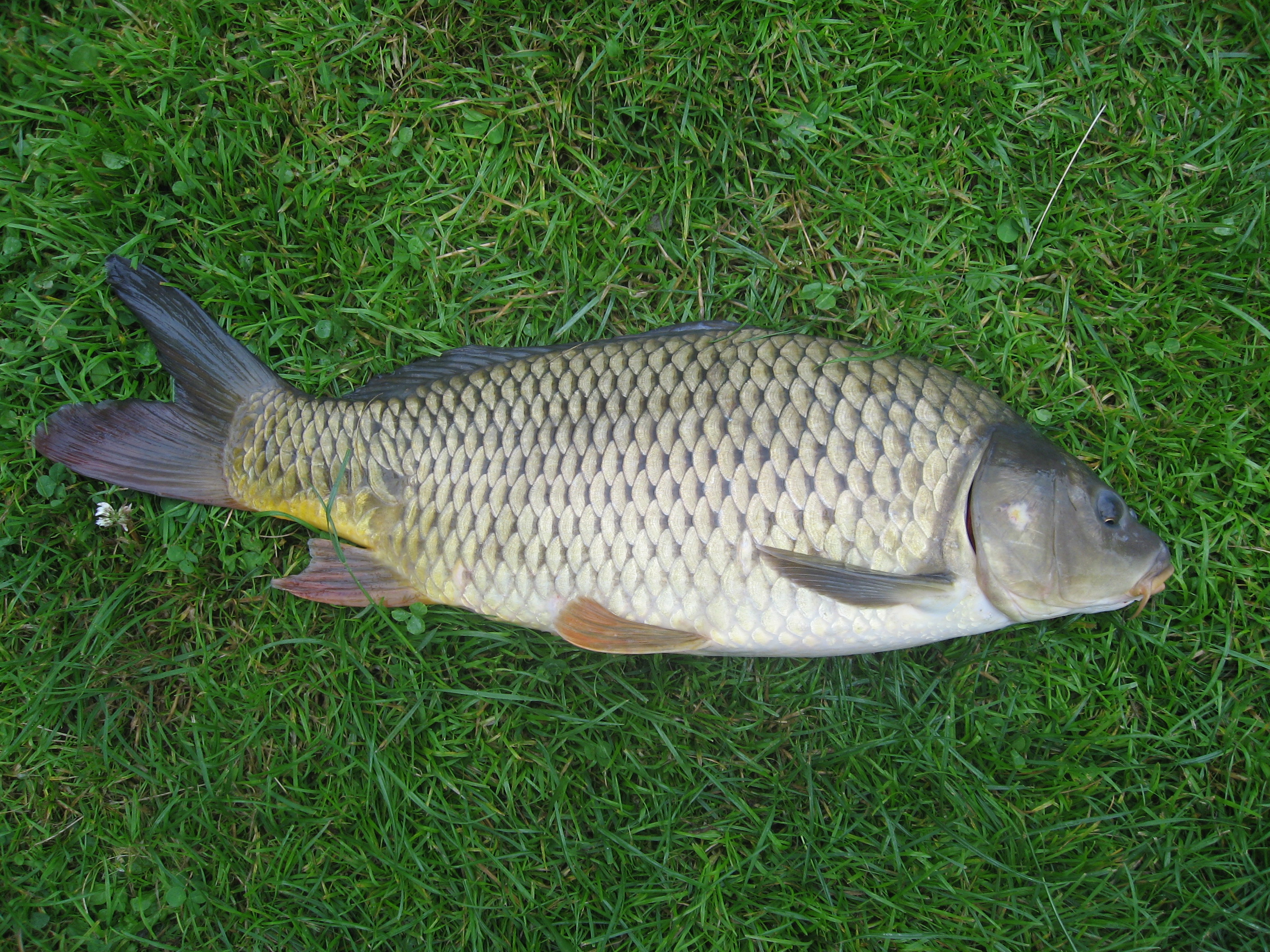
Common carp, a typical coarse fish

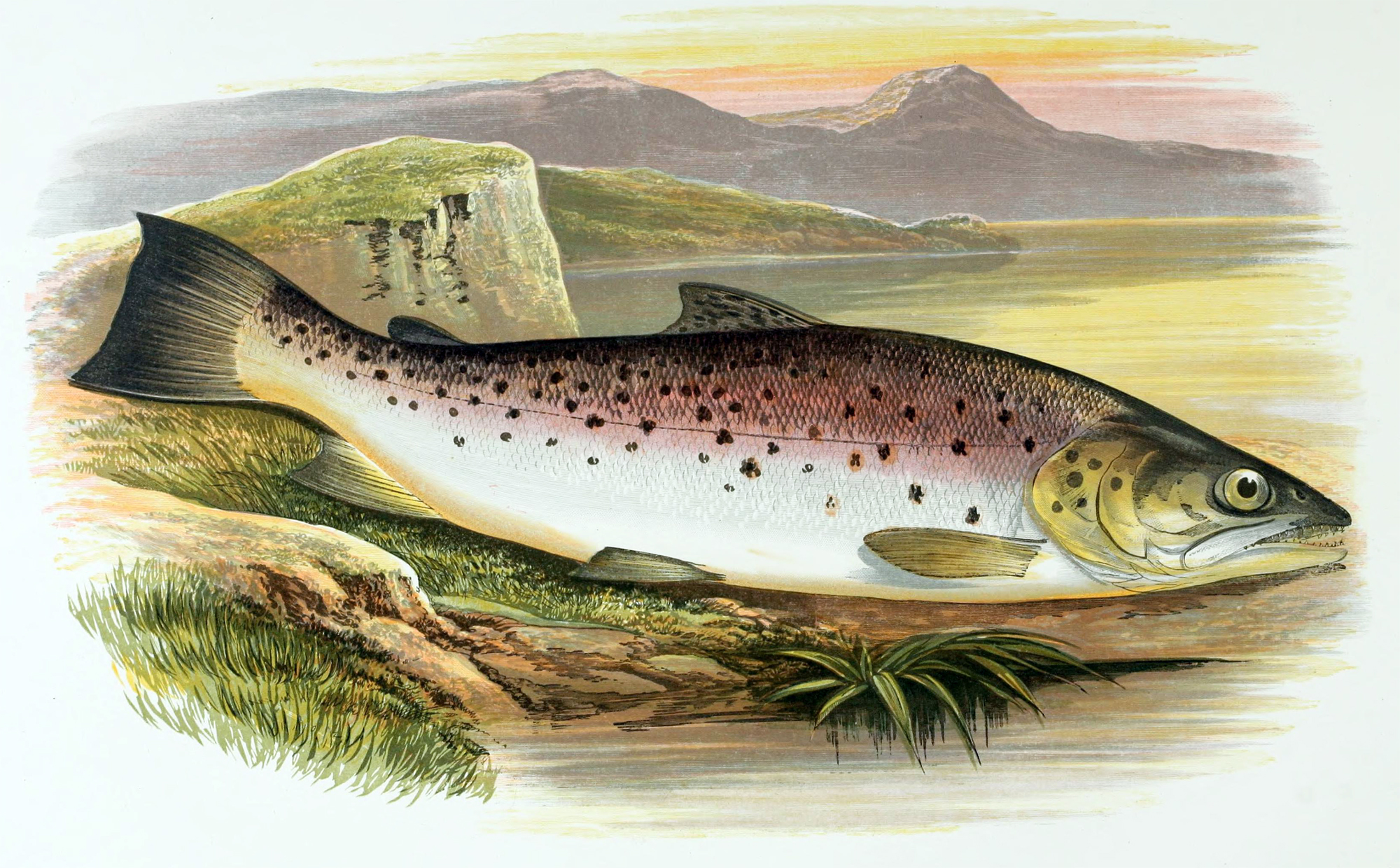
Ferox trout, a typical game fish

=== Game fish ===
When fishing on rivers for game fish (i.e., brown, rainbow, brook and sea trout, salmon and in some cases grayling), artificial flies, small spinners and lures are a popular choice for many game anglers due their ability to mimic prey items, (such as small invertebrates), on the surface and top layers of the water, enticing the fish into feeding.

=== General ===
Both floating and sinking flies and lures can be used to fish either on the surface or in the upper layers of the water. Usually, in the summer months, a spinner or fly manoeuvre across the surface will bring about a take from a fish due to the tendency of fish to move into the warmest part of the water, the surface and first layer—about 18 inches (46 cm)—of water below.

=== Coarse fish ===
When fishing a river for coarse fish species, such as chub, barbel, roach, dace and bream, the favourite hook baits tend to be maggot (white, red, and bronze), caster (maggot chrysalis), worm, cheese, pellets (halibut, trout, and carp), boilies (round boiled baits typically made with fish meal, milk, and soya) and luncheon meat.

Loose feed can be any of the above baits with a particle bait, sometimes in the form of hemp seed or a manufactured fishmeal ground bait.

For most species, hook baits will work. When targeting more specific species, such as specimen carps, baits such as boilies, large pellets, large bunches of maggots, floating baits, large lugworm, tiger nuts, and meat chunks from cat food can work well. Micro pellets softened along with ground bait can be fed alongside all hook baits.

Predatory fish such as pike, zander, perch, and eels can be caught using either dead or live bait, typically in the form of a small fish such as a live roach. However, some fishing venues prohibit the use of live bait.

Spinning, the use of an artificial lure, is also used for predators.

== Licences and fees ==
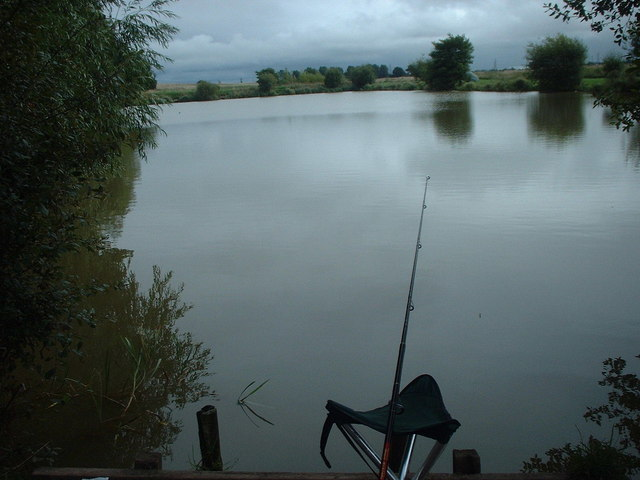
Coarse fishing lake

For all anglers in England and Wales, anyone aged 17 and over must purchase a valid rod licence before fishing. Children under 13 do not need a licence, and children aged 13–16 must get a free junior licence. This will enable anglers to fish legally in England and Wales for non-migratory trout and coarse fish.

A single rod licence will enable an angler to fish with up to three rods at any one time.

Most commercial fisheries and some rivers are operated on a day ticket basis. In the UK, these can vary in price. They are usually paid on the bank with a representative of the venue collecting the fees from anglers from the peg (fishing spot) at some time during the day, or prior to commencing fishing. In some cases, season tickets can be purchased.

Some lakes and river stretches are operated by angling clubs which charge annual membership fees. Application forms can be available from local tackle shops or angling club websites. Fishing venues can be operated by syndicates, usually by invitation. They can sometimes be joined by contacting a senior member of the syndicate.

== Tackle and technique ==
The most common types of tackle is the rod and reel, the rod being typically between 8 and 13 feet (2.4–4.0 m) long, and manufactured of tubular carbon fibres or splits of Tonkin bamboo. A reel is then attached near the base of the rod to hold a long length of line, which is run to the tip of the rod through eyelets. Once cast out, the line can be retrieved by winding a handle on the reel.

However, the use of "poles" is also widespread. Here, the line is fixed to the very tip of the rod, with no reel used: in order to retrieve the line, the pole itself is taken apart until the line can be swung to hand. Poles are often very long in order to increase the angler's range—up to 52 feet (16 m).

The main techniques used are float fishing, bottom fishing (legering) and lure fishing.

- In float fishing, the bait is suspended beneath a float made of hollow plastic, wood or quill. The top of the float is usually painted a bright colour and bites are indicated by the top of the float dipping under the surface of the water, or moving up in the water.
- Legering does not use floats. Instead the bait is held on the bottom of the lake or river by a sinker or large weight. Bites are detected by watching the quiver tip of the rod for movement, or with the use of electronic bite alarms, and more advanced tackle such as PVA bags or mesh.
- With lure fishing, either a brightly coloured fishing lure or a small baitfish attached to the hook is towed through the water to attract predatory fish such as pike, zander and perch.

Fly fishing techniques may also be used for certain species, such as grayling or chub.

For float and leger fishing, groundbait is usually thrown into the water to attract fish to the area. Typical baits include nightcrawlers, maggots, bread and sweet corn. Lately, advancements in technology and market competitiveness have led to many types of other ingredients being introduced, including chemicals, such as betaine, that stimulate the feeding response in fish. Boilies are popular baits for carp fishing.

== Target species ==
The main target species for this type of angling include:

Name	Scientific name	Image	Variants
Barbel	Barbus barbus		
Bream	Abramis brama		
Common carp	Cyprinus carpio		Grass, Common, Crucian, Leather, Mirror
Chub	Squalius cephalus		
Dace	Leuciscus leuciscus		
Ide	Leuciscus idus		
Perch	Perca fluviatilis		
Pike	Esox lucius		
Roach	Rutilus rutilus		
Rudd	Scardinius erythrophthalmus		
Tench	Tinca tinca		
Wels catfish	Silurus glanis		
Zander	Sander lucioperca		

=== Carp ===
Carps for this type of angling include:
Order	Family	Species	Image	Fishing method
Cypriniformes	Cyprinidae	Barbel (Barbus barbus)		Bait (worms, cheese, pellets)
Cypriniformes	Cyprinidae	Bream (Abramis brama)		Bait (corn, bread, worms)
Cypriniformes	Cyprinidae	Common carp (Cyprinus carpio); Variants: Grass Carp, Crucian Carp, Leather Carp, Mirror carp		Bait (worms, boilies, corn, bread)
Cypriniformes	Cyprinidae	Chub (Squalius cephalus)		Both (lures: small minnows, spoons; bait: bread, worms)
Cypriniformes	Cyprinidae	Dace (Leuciscus leuciscus)		Mainly bait (worms, insects, bread); micro-lures possible
Cypriniformes	Cyprinidae	Ide (Leuciscus idus)		Both (spoons, minnows; worms, grains)
Cypriniformes	Cyprinidae	Roach (Rutilus rutilus)		Mainly bait (worms, bread, grains)
Cypriniformes	Cyprinidae	Rudd (Scardinius erythrophthalmus)		Mainly bait; occasionally small lures
Cypriniformes	Cyprinidae	Tench (Tinca tinca)		Bait (worms, grains)

=== Perch ===
Perchs for this type of angling include:
Order	Family	Species	Image	Fishing method
Perciformes	Percidae	European perch (Perca fluviatilis)		Both (lures: spinners, spoons, minnows, soft baits, jigs; bait: worms, live fish)
Perciformes	Percidae	Zander (Sander lucioperca)		Both (lures: jigs, minnows; bait: worms, live fish)

=== Pike ===
Pikes for this type of angling include:
Order	Family	Species	Image	Fishing method
Esociformes	Esocidae	Northern pike (Esox lucius)		Mainly lures (spoons, spinners, jerkbaits); also live bait

=== Catfish ===
Catfishes for this type of angling include:
Order	Family	Species	Image	Fishing method
Siluriformes	Siluridae	Wels catfish (Silurus glanis)		Both (large baits, live fish, worms; large lures like swimbaits)

=== Less targeted species ===
Less targeted species include:

- Bullhead (Cottus gobio)
- Eel (Anguilla anguilla)
- Gobio gobio (gudgeon)
- Common minnow (Phoxinus phoxinus)
- Powan (Coregonus clupeoides)
- Ruffe (Gymnocephalus cernua)
- Three-spined stickleback (Gasterosteus aculeatus)

== See also ==
- Bycatch
