= Work in Fishing Convention, 2007 =

International Labour Organization Convention

C188
Work in Fishing Convention
- Ratifications of the Maritime Labour Convention Parties Ratification, convention not yet in force
- Drafted: 14 June 2007
- Location: Geneva
- Effective: 16 November 2017
- Condition: 10 ratifications; 8 of which are coastal states
- Parties: 25
- Depositary: Director-General of the International Labour Organization
- Languages: French and English

Work in Fishing Convention (2007) C 188, was adopted at the 96th International Labour Conference (ILC) of the International Labour Organization ILO in 2007. The objectives of the Convention is to ensure that fishers have decent conditions of work on board fishing vessels with regard to minimum requirements for work on board; conditions of service; accommodation and food; occupational safety and health protection; medical care and social security. It applies to all fishers and fishing vessels engaged in commercial fishing operations. It supersedes the old Conventions relating to fishermen.

== Subject area covered ==
The following subject areas, among others, are addressed: the responsibilities of fishing vessel owners and skippers for the safety of the fishers on board and the safety of the vessels; minimum age for work on board fishing vessels and for assignment to certain types of activities; medical examination and certification required for work on fishing vessels, with the possibility of exceptions for smaller vessels or those at sea for short periods; manning and hours of rest; crew lists; fishers’ work agreements; repatriation; recruitment and placement of fishers, and use of private employment agencies; payment of fishers; on board accommodation and food; medical care at sea; occupational safety and health; social security; and protection in the case of work-related sickness, injury or death (through a system for fishing vessel owners’ liability or compulsory insurance, workers’ compensation or other schemes).

== Responsibility ==
Article 8 of the convention provided the liability of owners of fishing vessels. The owner of the fishing vessel had the full responsibility for the master is possessing the resources and equipment necessary to fulfil the obligations of the convention.

== Recommendation ==
Work in Fishing Recommendation 2007 (No. 199) provides additional guidance on the matters covered by the Convention.

== Ratifications and force ==
The convention could come into force 12 months after it had been ratified by 10 states, eight of which had to be coastal countries. Following Lithuania's ratification of the convention on 16 November 2016, the convention came into force on 17 November 2017. As of February 2026, the convention has been ratified by 25 states:

Country	Deposit of instrument of ratification	Status
Angola	11 Oct 2016	In Force
Antigua and Barbuda	28 Jul 2021	In Force
Argentina	15 Sep 2011	In Force
Belgium	11 Jun 2025	In force on 11 Jun 2026
Bosnia and Herzegovina	4 Feb 2010	In Force
Congo	14 May 2014	In Force
Côte d'Ivoire	8 Jun 2025	In force on 8 Jun 2026
Denmark	3 Feb 2020	In Force
Estonia	3 May 2016	In Force
France	28 Oct 2015	In Force
Ghana	28 Aug 2024	In Force
Kenya	4 Feb 2022	In force
Lithuania	16 Nov 2016	In Force
Morocco	16 May 2013	In Force
Namibia	20 Sep 2018	In Force
Netherlands	19 Dec 2019	In Force
Norway	8 Jan 2016	In Force
Poland	17 Dec 2019	In Force
Portugal	26 Nov 2019	In Force
Senegal	21 Sep 2018	In Force
South Africa	20 Jun 2013	In Force
Solomon Islands	8 Jan 2026	In force on 8 Jan 2027
Spain	28 Feb 2013	In Force
Thailand	30 Jan 2019	In Force
United Kingdom of Great Britain and Northern Ireland	11 Jan 2019	In Force
