= Bass Festival =

Festival in Rio Vista, California

The Bass Festival, also known as Bass Derby, is held during the second weekend of October in Rio Vista, California. It is the celebration of bass coming into the Sacramento River. It features a carnival, a street fair, live bands and a bass fishing competition. It is the largest annual event in Rio Vista with tens of thousands of people coming yearly.
