= Pacific Whiting Conservation Cooperative =

The Pacific Whiting Conservation Cooperative (PWCC) is a harvest and research cooperative formed by three companies that participate in the catcher/processor sector of the Pacific whiting (Merluccius productus) fishery – American Seafoods, Glacier Fish Company, and Trident Seafoods.

Pacific whiting (hake) is primarily made into surimi, a minced fish product used to make imitation crab and other products. More recently, there has been growth in the production of hake fillets.

PWCC was formed in 1997 to promote rational harvest, optimal utilization, and minimal waste in the whiting fishery. By working cooperatively, PWCC member companies have greatly improved product recovery rates and significantly decreased bycatch, notably of salmonids and rockfish, in our sector of the whiting fishery. PWCC also funds and performs research to generally improve the West Coast groundfish fishery. For example, PWCC sponsors an annual cooperative research survey with the National Marine Fisheries Service-Northwest Fisheries Science Center. The purpose of this research is to provide information about the abundance of juvenile Pacific whiting, which is used to determine the long-term health of the whiting resource.

Fish harvesting practices in the catcher/processor sector of the Pacific whiting fishery changed dramatically during the 1990s. The catcher/processor fishery evolved from an Olympic-style "race for fish" into a fish harvesting cooperative that emphasizes resource conservation and efficient production. The Pacific Fishery Management Council (Pacific Council) provided the needed regulatory framework for the change when it formally divided the annual total allowable catch of Pacific whiting among three fishery sectors: vessels delivering to shoreside processors (shoreside sector – 42%); vessels delivering to processing vessels (mothership sector – 24%); and vessels that both catch and process (catcher/processor sector – 34%). During this same period, the Pacific Council also imposed a license limitation program for the West Coast groundfish fishery, which limited participation in the fishery to qualified vessels.

To make optimal use of the annual Pacific whiting allowable harvest allocated to the catcher/processor sector, PWCC members negotiated the apportionment of this allocation on a company-by-company basis. The agreement is enforced by a contract signed by each of the cooperative members. The PWCC fishing cooperative has ended the "race for fish" in the catcher/processor sector, resulting in decreased bycatch and waste, improved product quality, and reduced fishing effort. For example, since formation of the PWCC, only 6 or 7 of the 10 eligible catcher/processor vessels have participated in the fishery, providing a significant reduction in fishing effort. In addition to direct benefits to PWCC members, the cooperative also sponsors scientific research that benefits the West Coast groundfish fishery. PWCC members are assessed a tonnage fee that is used to fund scientific research, including funding stock assessment and bycatch avoidance programs.
