= Gerrit Willem Dijsselhof =

Dutch artist (1866–1924)

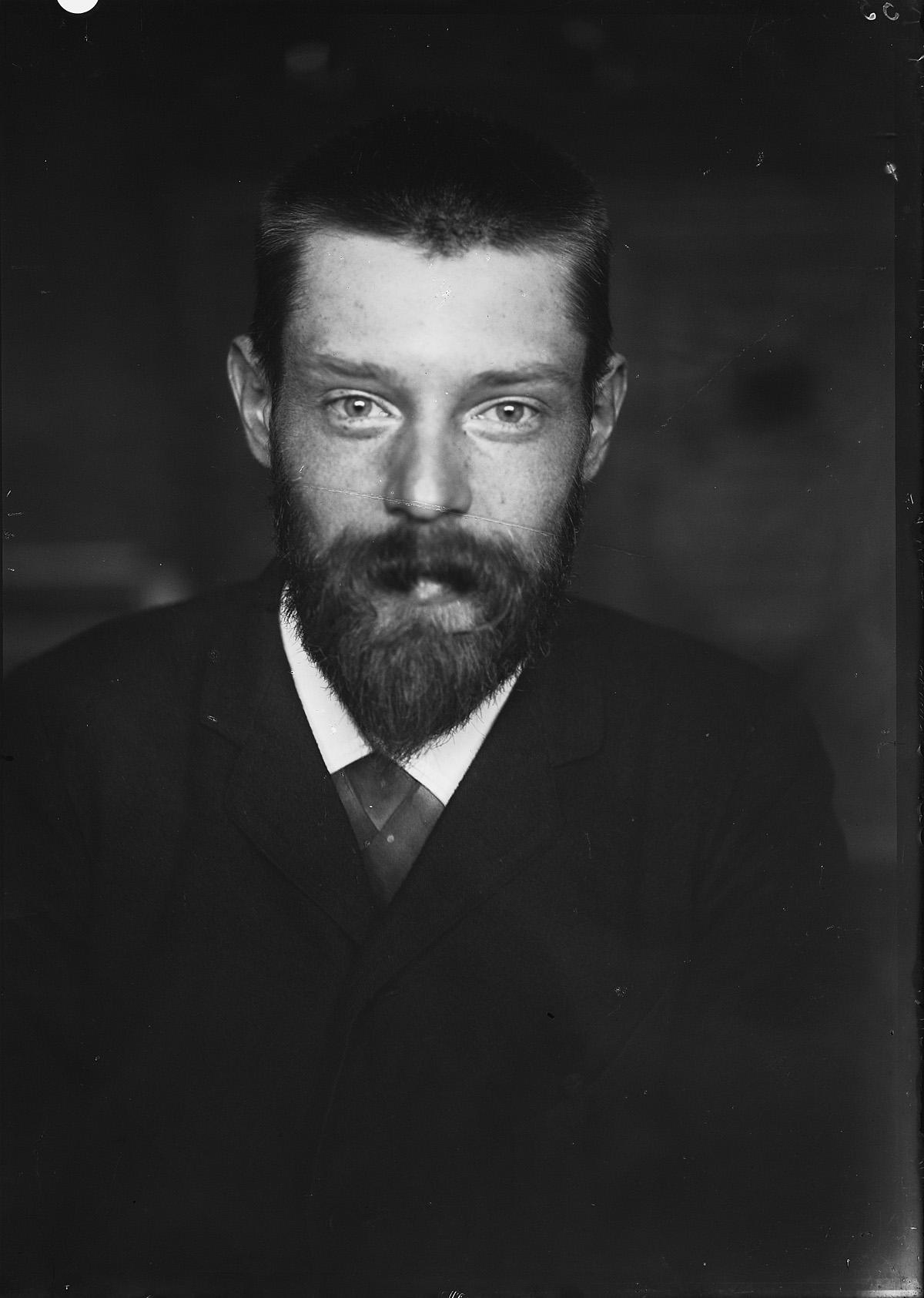
- Born: 8 February 1866; Zwollerkerspel, The Netherlands
- Died: 14 June 1924 (aged 58); Overveen, The Netherlands
- Known for: painter
- Spouse: Willy Keuchenius

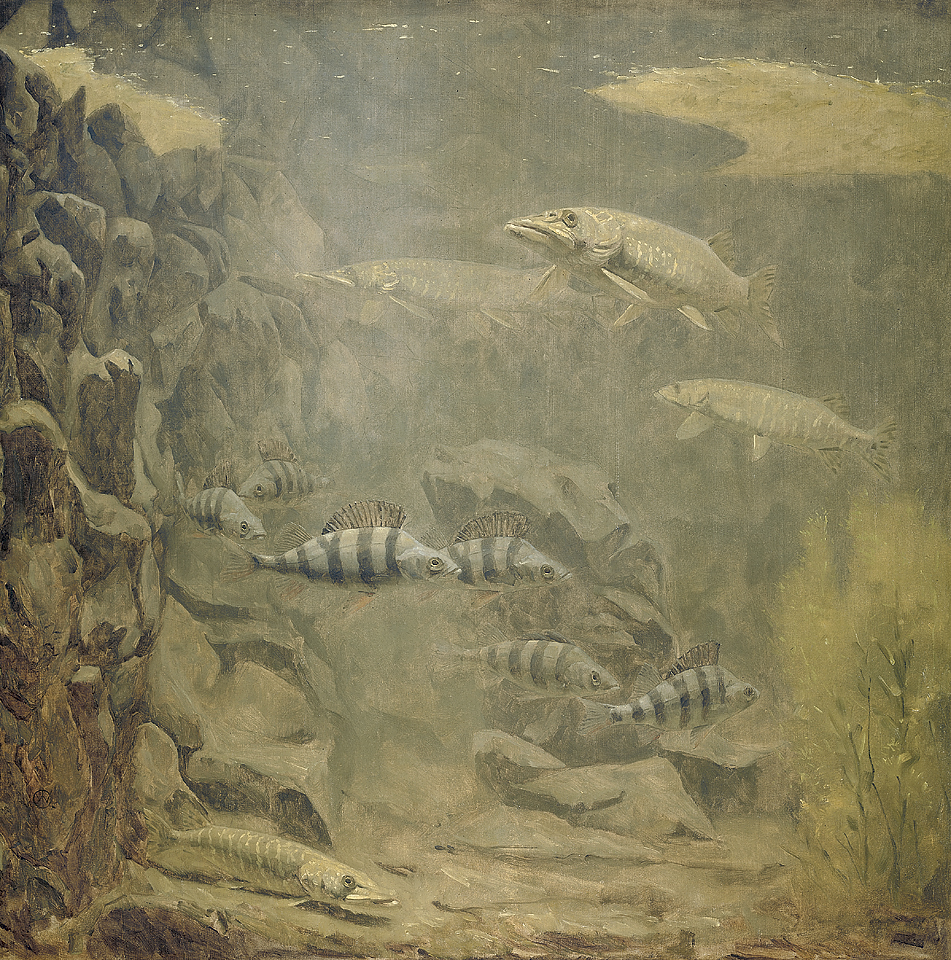
Pike and Perch in an Aquarium

Gerrit Willem Dijsselhof (1866 – 1924), was a Dutch painter involved in the arts and crafts movement.

== Biography ==
Born in Zwollerkerspel to a farmer, he studied first at the art academy in The Hague, but moved to Amsterdam in 1884 to follow lessons at the arts and crafts school. He was a member of Natura Artis Magistra and especially enjoyed watching their new aquarium which opened in 1882. He spent many afternoons after his studies at the art academy there sketching and painting the fish in watercolours. From 1897 he worked on furniture design for the firm E.J. van Wisselingh & Co., Amsterdam. He married the textile artist Willy Keuchenius.

He died in Overveen.
