= Research Institute for Aquaculture No 1 =

Research Institute for Aquaculture No.1
- Abbreviation: RIA1
- Formation: 1963
- Type: Research institution
- Purpose: Aquaculture
- Headquarters: Bac Ninh, Vietnam
- Coordinates: 21.1023498°N 105.9391584°E
- Region served: Vietnam
- Official language: Vietnamese
- Director: Dang Thi Lua
- Website: http://www.ria1.org/

Research Institute for Aquaculture No 1, or RIA1, is a government organization under the Ministry of Agriculture and Rural Development Vietnam. RIA1 is responsible for carrying out basic and applied research programs for inland, coastal, and marine aquaculture, including involvement in planning and development activities.

RIA1 is a national multifunction institute dealing with research, education, and extension in aquaculture and aquatic resources management. The Institute also plays an advisory role for many other aquaculture development projects.

RIA1 was established in 1963 initially as a freshwater fish research centre.
