= Grey nurse shark conservation =

Conservation management of grey nurse sharks

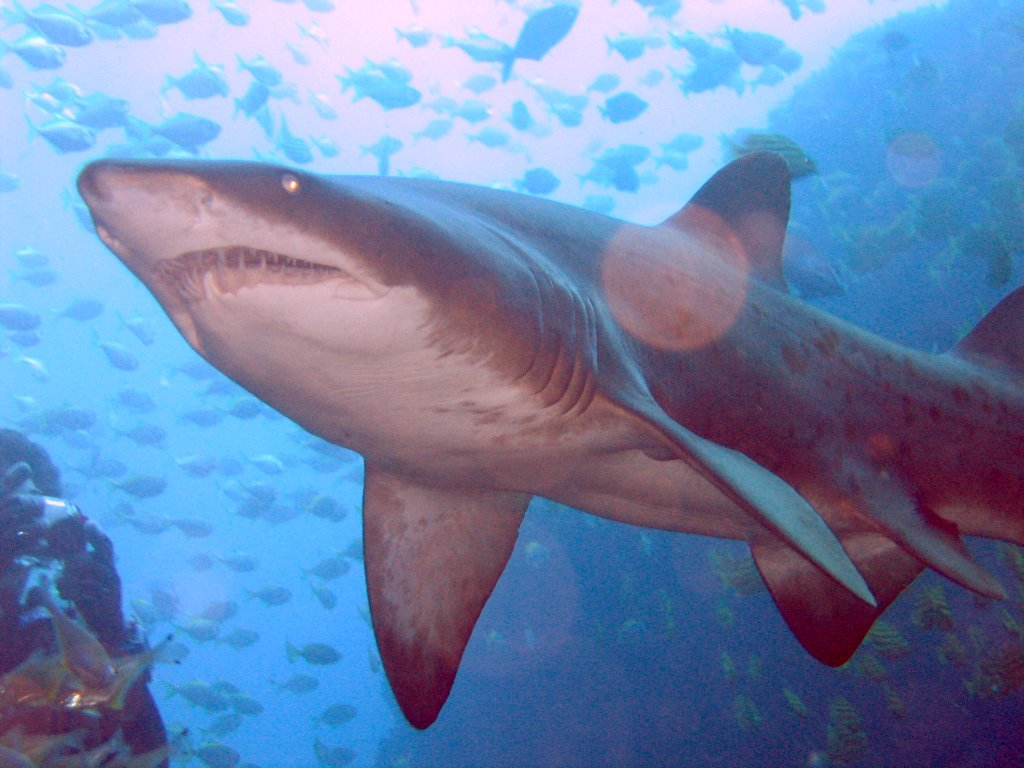
Grey nurse shark

One of the first shark species to be protected was the grey nurse shark or sand tiger shark (Carcharias taurus). Its biology, distribution, and conservation have been extensively studied, particularly in Australian waters, where it first became protected.

== Biology ==
The grey nurse shark, Carcharias taurus, also called the ragged-tooth shark, is an elasmobranch and belongs to the odontaspididae (ragged-tooth) shark family. It can easily be recognized by its characteristic conical snout and under hung jaw. Both jaws are laden with sharp, long and pointed teeth. The head is flattened and it has a large and stout body, which ranges up to 3.2 m and may weigh up to 300 kg. The body is grey to grey-brown dorsally and off-white on the belly. The juveniles (young sharks) usually have dark spots on the upper two-thirds of the body. The first and second dorsal fins are of similar size and the caudal fin is asymmetric. Once believed to be a man-eater, it is now known that this shark rarely attacks humans and if it does it is only in defense, or if it is baited.

Sharks are top oceanic predators, and as such they are essential for marine ecosystems as regulators of other species. They commonly eat easy prey such as weak, old, or dead animals. Grey nurse sharks eat mainly lobsters, crabs, smaller sharks, fish, rays and squid.

Grey nurse sharks have an extremely slow life history, which makes them particularly vulnerable to overfishing. They are aplacental viviparous: embryos first consume their own yolk and then feed on unfertilised eggs and smaller embryos (oophagy and intra-uterine cannibalism), so that typically only one pup survives in each uterus and litters rarely exceed two young. Females have a gestation period of about 9–12 months followed by a resting period of roughly a year, so individual females give birth only every second year and produce on average fewer than one pup per year. Age-at-maturity is also late, at about 6–7 years for males and 9–10 years for females, giving the species one of the lowest intrinsic rates of population increase recorded for any shark.

== Distribution ==
Grey nurse sharks live near the coast in sub-tropical to cool-temperate waters near most continental land masses (not found in the eastern Pacific Ocean off North and South America). They have a preference for some places resulting in an uneven distribution. For example, there are few grey nurse sharks found in north Australia while they are relatively abundant in the southern part of the eastern and western Australian waters.

They are usually found swimming slowly, just above the sea floor, in sandy-bottomed gutters or in rocky underwater caves near inshore rocky reefs and islands. They can be found at depths ranging from 10 m (near the coastline) to 200 m (on the continental shelf). They are generally solitary but at times small schools of grey nurse sharks are found swimming and feeding together.

== Conservation status in Australia ==
The grey nurse shark is regarded as one of the most threatened large shark species and was among the first sharks to receive legal protection. Targeted killing due to its fearsome appearance, together with by-catch in commercial fisheries and shark-control programmes, led to steep declines in abundance along the Australian east coast during the mid-20th century. It was first given legal protection in New South Wales coastal waters in 1984, and has since been protected nationally.

The species is now assessed globally as Critically Endangered on the IUCN Red List, reflecting its fragmented distribution, very low reproductive rate and continuing declines in several parts of its range. Within Australia, genetic and movement data support the recognition of two largely separate populations: an eastern population in Queensland and New South Wales waters, and a western population centred off Western Australia.

Under the Australian Environment Protection and Biodiversity Conservation Act 1999 (EPBC Act) the east coast population of grey nurse shark is listed as Critically Endangered, while the west coast population is listed as Vulnerable. The species is also protected under state and territory legislation: for example, the east coast population is listed as Critically Endangered under the New South Wales Fisheries Management Act 1994, and as a threatened species under corresponding legislation in Queensland, Western Australia, Victoria and Tasmania.

== Current status ==
The population of grey nurse sharks in eastern Australia declined sharply through the 1960s and 1970s as a result of targeted spearfishing, game fishing and shark-control programmes, and was already considered depleted by the time full legal protection was introduced in the late 1990s. Early mark–recapture and genetic studies suggested that the total eastern Australian population was likely to be in the low thousands and that the effective breeding population was considerably smaller.

More recent close-kin mark-recapture analyses indicate that the adult eastern population remains small but may now be slowly increasing. A 2018 assessment estimated around 2,000 adult sharks with an annual growth rate of about 3–4%, and an updated analysis using refined ageing methods estimated an adult abundance of about 1,400 individuals in 2023 (95% confidence interval approximately 900–1,900 adults) with an annual growth rate of around 5%. These results suggest that existing protection and habitat-based management are preventing further decline, but the population remains at a low absolute size and is still considered at high risk of extinction.

== Causes for decline ==
Every year, millions of sharks are killed by driftnets, by-catch, revenge actions, beach protective shark meshing, commercial-, recreational- and spear-fishing. The main risk is from by-catch of indirect methods of line fishing and particularly bottom-set commercial fishing lines targeting wobbegong sharks. The grey nurse shark is particularly vulnerable to these pressures because of its very slow life history. Individuals grow slowly and do not reach sexual maturity until about six to seven years of age for males and nine to ten years for females, and females follow a biennial reproductive cycle in which a maximum of two pups are produced after a 9–12 month gestation. This combination of late maturity and very low fecundity means that even small increases in fishing mortality or incidental capture can cause long-term population decline. Furthermore, the species has a limited number of preferred aggregation sites and specific habitat requirements, which restrict opportunities for recolonisation of depleted areas.

== Conservation efforts ==
In Australia, conservation management for grey nurse sharks has focused on both legal protection and habitat-based measures. A series of key aggregation sites along the New South Wales and Queensland coasts (including Fish Rock, Green Island, Julian Rocks, Magic Point and Wolf Rock) have been identified as critical habitat and afforded special protection under state and Commonwealth legislation. At many of these sites, fishing is restricted or prohibited, and there are codes of conduct for divers aimed at minimising disturbance and reducing the risk of hook and line injuries to sharks that aggregate in gutters and caves. These measures are complemented by a national recovery plan under the EPBC Act, which sets objectives for monitoring population trends and mitigating key threats such as incidental capture in commercial and recreational fisheries.

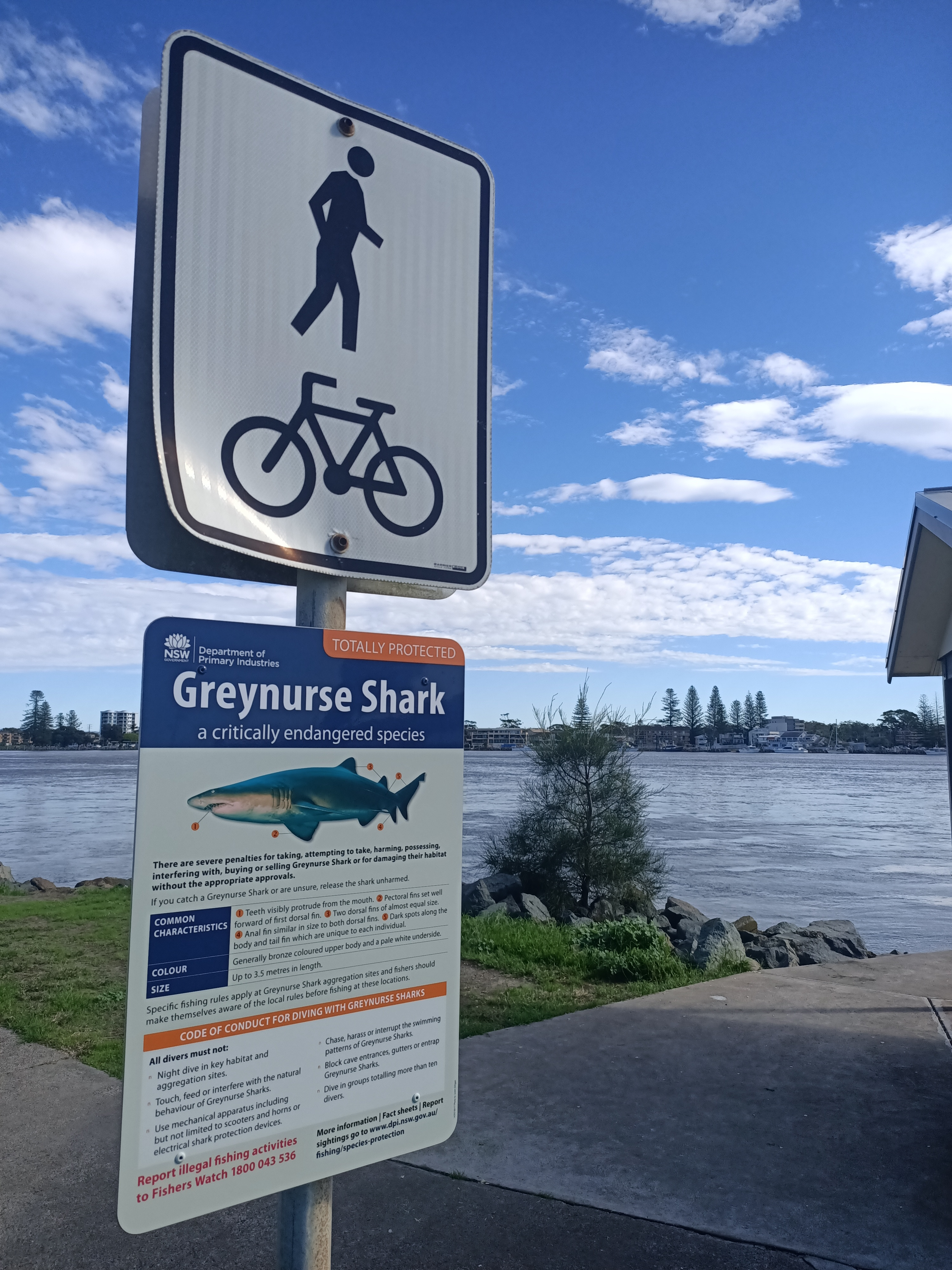
NSW Government sign outlining legal protections and conservation measures for grey nurse sharks

The increased public awareness has led to the development of methods that reduce the unintentional killing of elasmobranch (sharks and rays), turtles and marine mammals. An inexpensive method to reduce by-catch is by using tunnel excluders. These enable sharks, turtles and rays to escape and survive. A prototype used by the Dutch achieved a 40-100% reduction of the by-catch of the most vulnerable species.

The size and texture of nets are also of great importance for the survival of larger vulnerable species. Often smaller nets have been shown to catch the same amount of target fish and reduce the by-catch greatly, especially of the mature sharks.

Foundation of protected marine areas is particularly valuable for protecting sharks and a new method, taggingCSIRO, can reveal their preferred forage and breeding areas. A good example of managed marine areas is to be found in Jervis Bay, NSW. Jervis Bay has been divided into time zones, some for fishing and some for diving, and the strategy has been approved by both fishermen and divers. However, “Divers that regularly dive at places like South West Rocks in New South Wales will tell you that up to 70 per cent of the sharks there are trailing hooks from line fishing.” says Nicola Beynon from the Humane Society International (HSI). Another widely used method for preserving sharks is eco-tourism such as scuba diving, cage-diving and feeding of sharks. However, it is crucial that this is strictly managed, and that the sharks' behaviour is monitored. Feeding and touching of marine animals should be strictly discouraged since it can alter their behaviour, and result in long lasting and severe stress to the animals. Divers have noticed sharks altering their behaviour due to increased hierarchy behaviour around killing areas. The lowest in the hierarchy become stressed and exhibit unpredictable behaviour, which could result in attacks on humans.
