= Diawl bach =

Fly pattern

- Artificial fly
- Type: Wet fly

History
- Creator: British
- Typical hooks: Fulling Mill Competition Heavyweight Black size 10
- Thread: Uni 8/0 black thread
- Tail: Dyed black hen fibres
- Body: Black peacock herl
- Ribbing: Red UTC Tinsel with Opal Mirage back
- Throat: Dyed black hen fibres
- Cheek: Jungle Cock

Meaning "little devil", the diawl bach is a popular Welsh fly pattern used in British still waters, and an appropriate lure to use when the fish are feeding on midge pupae. The dressing is simple: size 8 to 14 hook, brown thread, a few barbs of brown hackle for the tail, copper wire, a few barbs of peacock herl for the body, and tying thread for the head.

== Variations ==
Variations include jungle cock substitute cheeks, red head, hare's ear for the body and flash materials on the back.

== Fishing approach ==
Fish as one of a team of three flies drawn slowly on a dry line with a long leader. A particularly effective method is to let the wind push the floating fly line around and look for a twitch in the line as indication that a fish has taken the fly. It can be effective during a midge (chironomid) hatch, and a flashy version is worth using towards the autumn as a pinfry imitator.
