= Couta =

Type of sailing boat

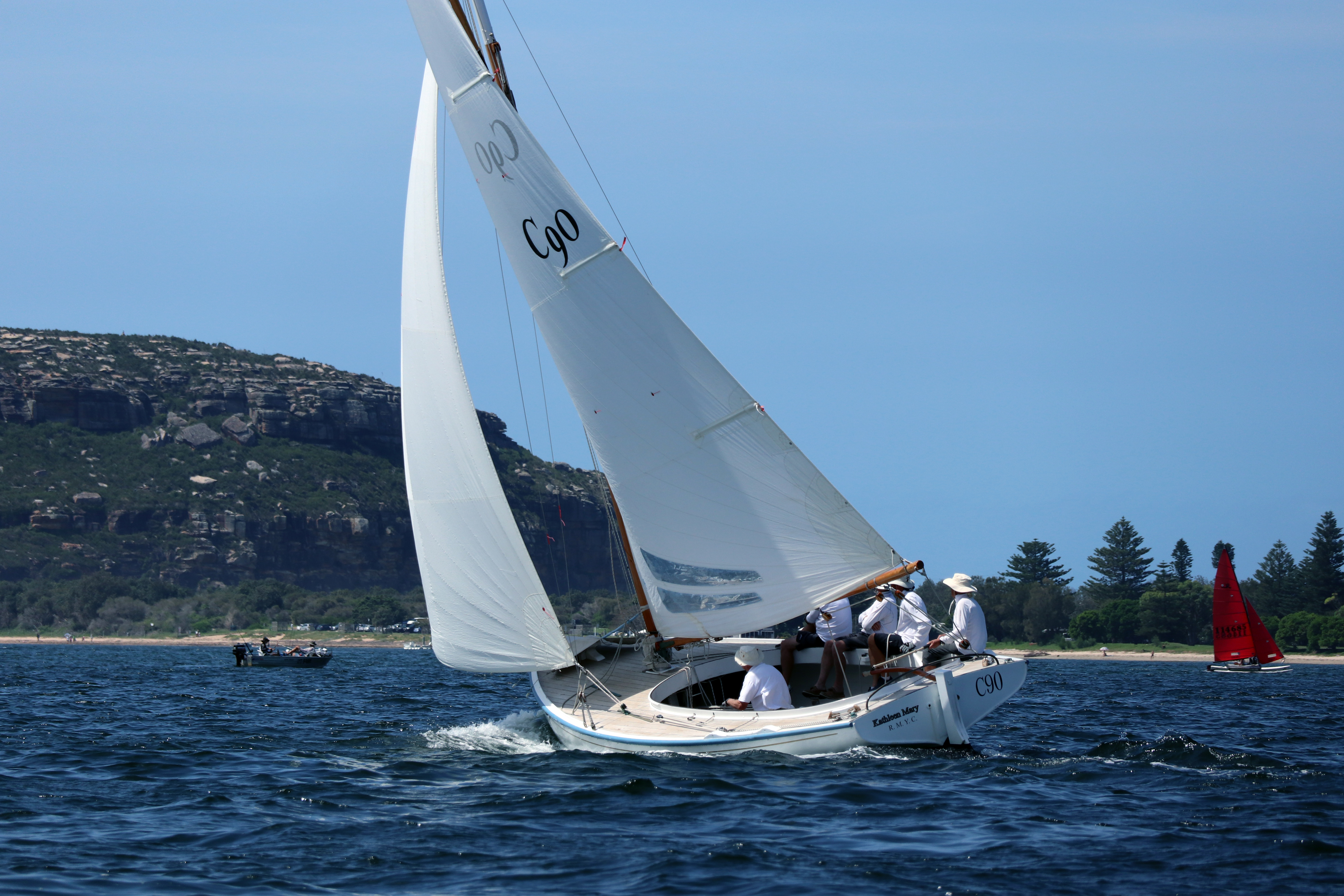
Couta boat, Kathleen Mary sailing on Pittwater, February 29th 2020

A couta boat is a type of sailing vessel originally designed and built in Victoria, Australia, around the fishing ports of Sorrento and Queenscliff, and along Victoria's west coast as far west as Portland. Mostly used from around 1870 until the 1930s, the couta boat survived as a commercial fishing vessel until the 1950s. From the 1970s onwards, a community of enthusiasts started restoring old couta boats to use recreationally.

== History ==
=== As a fishing vessel ===
The couta boat was developed for the coastal fishing industry during the later part of the 19th century. It was particularly used to catch the fish Thyrsites atun, locally called the "barracouta", a confusion with the larger ocean barracuda. The boats headed out to the fishing grounds before dawn, most often through the infamous and often treacherous Rip, the entrance to Port Phillip

Although load-carrying capacity was important, the need for speed under sail was also a desired characteristic. Fishing cooperatives established quotas to control prices, which led to the added requirement of speed in a good boat. Once their quota of "barracouta" was met, the fishermen sailed back to port as fast as they could — the first boat back got the best prices.

The typical couta boat carried a gaff sail and jib, set out on a long bowsprit, although the mainsail developed into more of a gunter sail, because it had a very high-peaked gaff or yard. A rig peculiar to the couta boat evolved, which allowed for sail to be carried much higher than previously, and included a distinctive downward-curved bowsprit.

As efficient and competitive commercial fishing vessels, couta boats reached their peak in the 1920s and 1930s. After World War II, the development of boat engines, and the growing preference for shark, began lessening the importance of couta boats.

=== As a recreational sailing boat ===
The couta boat became a victim of the modernisation of the fishing industry after World War II, and survives due only to the efforts of a small group of individuals with a sense of history and an admiration for maritime tradition. Regretting the apparent inevitability that the distinctive boats would become a footnote in Australia’s seafaring history, from the late 1970s onwards, a few dedicated people sought and restored remaining couta boats that were either still afloat or propped up in backyards along the coast.

Couta boats are sought after and keenly compete in races. Many are built new because the supply of originals has been exhausted. There is a couta boat club in Sorrento, and another in Queenscliff.

== Early Example ==
Thistle, one of the oldest surviving examples of a couta boat, was designed and built in Victoria by J.R. Jones, in about 1903. She was purchased in 1987 and restored by Tim Phillips for the Australian National Maritime Museum, and went on display in 1990.
