= International Land-Based Shark Fishing Association =

- Formation: May 29, 2006
- Location: North Port, Florida
- Official language: English
- Founder: Sean Paxton
- Key people: Lead Committee Members: Sean Paxton; Brooks Paxton II; Jim Adam; Zach "Hammer" Miller; Jeff Shindle; Josh Jorgensen; Gabriel Smeby; Justin Lerner Tom Kieras
- Website: http://www.landbasedsharkfishing.com/

The International Land-Based Shark Fishing Association (ILSFA) was formed to unify the sport of land-based shark fishing and its anglers by establish of the standards for the compilation and recognition of world records, while also promoting, through research, education and practice, responsible enjoyment and stewardship of marine and coastal resources.

Land-based shark fishing is defined as attempting to capture or actually capturing sharks using a rod, reel, line, and hook(s) from the land or anything permanently attached to the land, for example, jetties, piers or bridges.

Among the defining efforts of the ILSFA is the designation of a new world record category for sharks released after capture. By using a widely accepted large species estimated weight formula, in conjunction with other specific qualifying measures, anglers will have the opportunity to be officially recognized internationally for their accomplishments without having to weigh their catch.

With large, predatory species, such as sharks, this has never been practical without killing an animal for the purpose of obtaining its true weight. ILSFA will also issue records for weighed fish. However, the expanding trend in this rapidly growing sport is the practice of catch and release.

The fusion of this trend combined with the new record category, cooperative shark research, a devoted membership and partnerships with various research organizations, tackle manufacturers and the recreational fishing industry as a whole is intended to be successful at covering most interests.

The ILSFA was founded in 2006 by the current president, Sean Paxton. The ISLFA has been promoted on the South Florida Shark Club fishing forum by William Fundora where many pictures of large sharks caught were posted. Natgeo has reported fishermen on this Florida shark fishing forum posted about catching 1,527 sharks from 2010 to 2015.

This one-of-a-kind sport, along with its rich history and dedicated anglers need a place to call home

— Sean Paxton.
