= Maszoperia =

Organization

Maszoperia (Kashubian: maszoperëjô; from Dutch: maatschappij, meaning company or society, plural: maszoperie) was a socio-economic organisation of coastal Kashubian fishermen, especially from Kashubian villages on the Hel Peninsula (Chałupy, Kuźnica, Jastarnia).

== Literature ==
- Bernard Sychta. Słownik gwar kaszubskich na tle kultury ludowej, Ossolineum, Wrocław - Warszawa - Kraków 1969, tom III, s. 57
