= Stanley (boat) =

History

Iceland
- Name: Stanley
- Builder: Þórir Pálsson, Iceland
- Launched: c.1860
- Fate: Ran aground in 1908 and broke up
- Notes: First motorized fishing vessel in Iceland

General characteristics
- Class & type: Sexæringur (until 1902); Motorized Fishing Vessel (from 1902)
- Propulsion: 2 hp C.H. Möllerups

Stanley was an Icelandic fishing boat. Originally a six oar rowboat (Icelandic: Sexæringur), it was the first boat in Iceland to be equipped with an engine. Its successful mechanization is considered the start of the industrial revolution of the fishing industry in Iceland.

== History ==
Guðmundur Guðmundsson, a farmer in Eyri in Mjóifjörður, originally had the boat built for himself. The shipbuilder was Þórir Pálsson (1797–1886) and the boat was probably built before or around 1860. Around 1885 the boat went by the name Skálin and Guðmundur had a cabin in Bolungarvík which was called Skálarbúð. The naming was said to have come from the fact that Guðmundur treated boat as if it were a glass bowl (Icelandic: Skál) or porcelain. Þórir tested all the wood that was to be used in the boat by chopping a bit of it and put in water, and only using it if it floated well.

Árni Gíslason bought Skálin in 1890 from Guðmundur's son-in-law, Ebenezer Ebenezarson. After buying it, Árni renamed the ship Stanley. In 1902, Árni along with trader Sophus J. Nielsen, equipped the boat with a 2 hp engine from the Danish engine maker C.H. Möllerups. The boat was first launched from Ísafjörður with the engine on 25 November 1902. Despite initial doubts by many, the boats mechanization was a great success and soon much of the fishing fleet was mechanized. The boat's fishing went well until it ran aground in Borgarbót in Skötufjörður in 1908 and broke up. The boat was at that time owned by Bjarni Sigurðsson, a farmer in Borg.
