= Dongwon-ho 628 =

South Korean deep-sea commercial trawler

- Hangul: 동원호 제628호
- RR: Dongwonho je628ho
- MR: Tongwŏnho che628ho

Dongwon-ho 628 (Korean: 동원호 제628호) is a deep-sea commercial trawler operated by Dongwon Fisheries, a part of South Korea's Dongwon Group. It became the center of a high-profile incident when it was seized in international waters off Somalia by pirates in April 2006. The crew and the ship were finally released in August 2006 after the payment of a ransom estimated at several hundred thousand dollars.

According to media reports, the boat was in international waters near two other vessels when two speedboats approached and landed armed attackers on board. They seized control of the ship and moved it into Somalia's territorial waters. The ship was pursued briefly by US and Dutch naval ships, but these gave up the chase when the pirates threatened the crew with guns.

The 25-person crew consisted of Vietnamese, Indonesian, and Chinese sailors, in addition to South Koreans. All four countries followed the subsequent events closely. The released crew were greeted upon their arrival in Mombasa by the assembled ambassadors of their home countries.
