= Egg sucking leech =

Species of Artificial fly

- Artificial fly
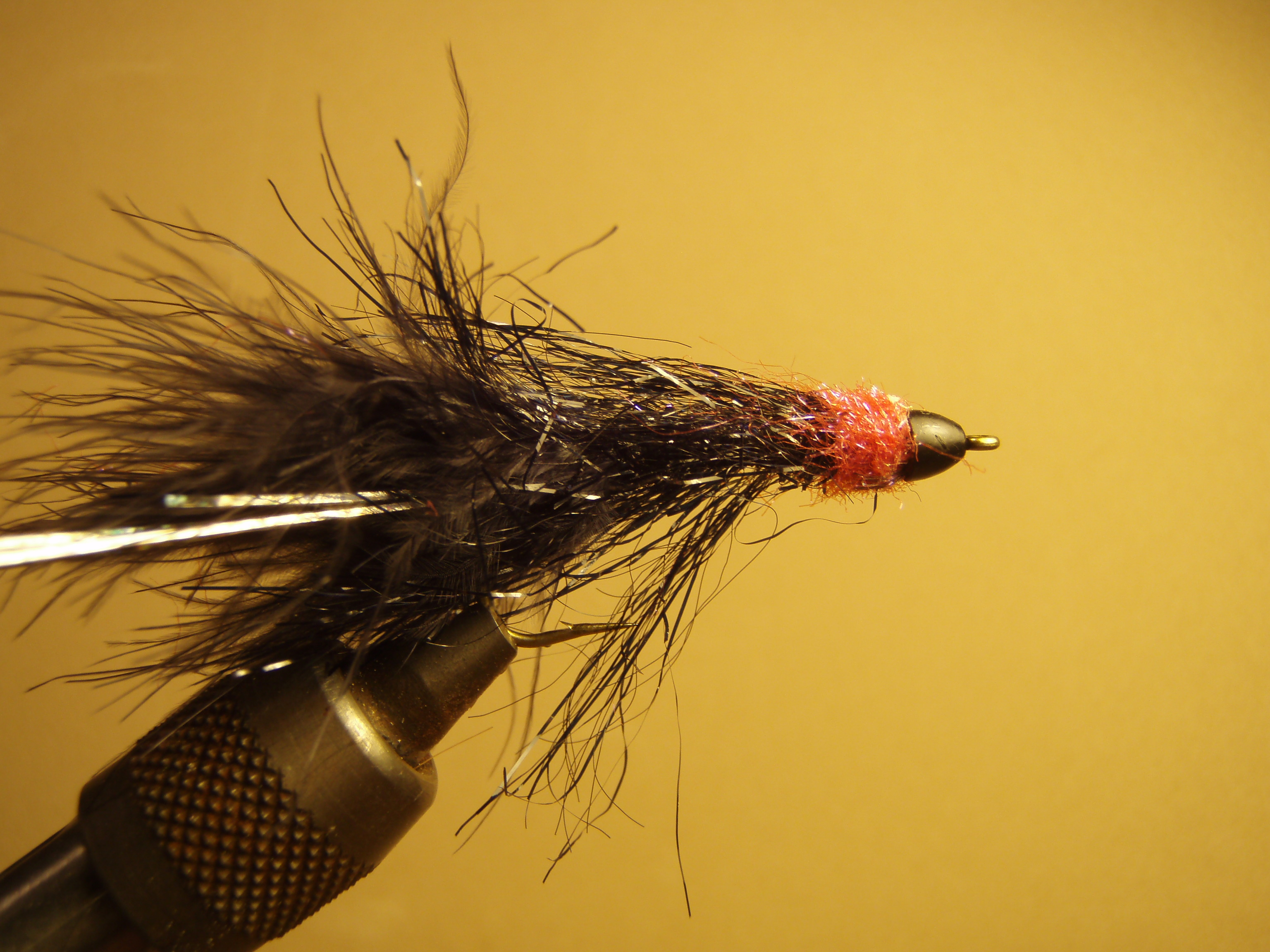
- Type: Streamer
- Imitates: Leech sucking egg
- Typical hooks: Streamer
- Tail: Black maribou
- Body: black chenille
- Ribbing: black hen hackle and black wire
- Throat: Hot pink or red chenille ball

Uses
- Primary use: salmon, steelhead
- Other uses: trout, bass, pike

Reference(s)
- Pattern references: Bristol Bay Flies

The egg-sucking leech is an artificial fly used in fly fishing. Its name comes from its resemblance to a leech in the process of consuming a fish egg. The body of the lure is dark-colored like a leech, often black or purple, and the tip of the lure is bright red or orange to look like a small rounded fish egg. It is effective for catching fish which might be interested in prey items such as leeches. It is popular for steelhead fishing.

This fly can be used to capture salmon, trout, bass, pike, and many other species of fish.
