= Jacksonville Kingfish Tournament =

Fishing tournament in Jacksonville, Florida, United States

- Date: 2nd week of July
- Location: Jim King Park And Boat Ramp At Sisters Creek 8203 Heckscher Drive Jacksonville FL 32226
- Type: single fish; pair of fish
- Established: 1981
- Entry fee: $400/boat
- Top prize: boat/motor/trailer $200k+
- Species: King mackerel & Cobia
- Record: 55.2 lb (single) 75.9 lb (pair)
- URL: Jacksonville Kingfish Tournament
- Organization: Jacksonville Marine Charities, Inc.

The Greater Jacksonville Kingfish Tournament (GJKT) is a King mackerel fishing contest held over six days in July in Jacksonville, Florida. It is the world's largest kingfish tournament. According to Rick Ryals, a local boat captain, the GJKT is "true competition in its purest form. It doesn’t matter how big your boat is or how much it costs. There are no secret weapons. There is only good solid preparation and the luck of the draw."

== History ==
In 1980, a handful of Jacksonville businessmen including Bob Gipson, Walt Murr and Pete Loftin resolved to create a fishing contest like the ones offered in Miami and Fort Lauderdale. The first tournament was staged in 1981 at the Beach Marina on Beach Blvd. at the Intracoastal Waterway. Commuters on their way home would stop, relax and enjoy the event. For thousands of spectators, it became more of a food festival than a fishing tournament. That changed drastically in 1996, when the tournament was moved to Sisters Creek Park, a much larger area but more remote. A newspaper reporter stated that "Sister's Creek (Park) isn't 'on the way' to anywhere from anywhere. If you're headed that way, you're pretty much headed there." The location is ten miles northeast of the city center, down a winding, two-lane road.

=== Charity ===
By the tenth year of the tournament, the event was firmly established and had grown so large that a legal entity was needed to take responsibility for signing contracts and handling finances. Jacksonville Marine Charities, Inc. (JMC) was founded in 1991 as a 501(c)(3) non-profit organization to run the tournament and distribute the proceeds. Leona Sheddan was executive director of the tournament for eight years. The projects that JMC supports must be marine-oriented and originate with another not-for-profit group. In its history, JMC has awarded over $650,000 to other non-profits, which has benefited all Floridians, as well as First Coast residents.

Current and past projects have included:

- Development of Sisters Creek Park and more than $308K contributions to the park maintenance & improvement fund.
- Helen Cooper Floyd (Little Jetties) Park renovation.
- A scholarship fund for marine science and oceanography students at Jacksonville University and the University of North Florida
- Jacksonville University Marine science research projects.
- Offering the Boater 101 marine science education course in area public and private high schools
- Support for the Reef Ball project at Mandarin High School.
- Encouragement of marine conservation and habitat preservation
- Donations to:
  - Jacksonville Offshore Fishing Club's Reef Projects
  - National Ocean Sciences Bowl
  - St. Johns Riverkeeper
  - Safe Harbor Boys Home

=== Silver anniversary ===
For the 25th tournament in 2005, special events were added to the week's activities. The GJKT invited all the previous first, second and third-place winners to participate in a Tournament of Champions on Monday, and offered a $10,000 cash prize. The VIP Tournament, also on Monday, had $50,000 in cash for the winner, and the Yamaha Pro Kingfish Tour held a two-day contest for the biggest two-fish catch with $40,000 in cash. The Junior Angler Tournament was Tuesday, then the Greater Jacksonville Kingfish Tournament was Thursday and Friday, with cash and prizes valued at over $400,000.

=== Controversies ===
The history of the GJKT has been relatively free of controversy; the first exception being 2007. Scott Senecal had the highest total weight for two fish at 66.95 pounds at the end of the second day. Later in the evening, tournament officials discovered that Senecal's Contender 23T was actually a 25-foot boat and not eligible for the 23 Class. His entry was moved into the Ultra category due to "a clerical error on our part" by the tournament official present. The next morning, executive director Mike Wheeler erroneously stated that 2nd-place finisher Don Combs had filed a protest, and the rules committee would meet in the afternoon. Senecal was invited to attend, but he chose not to. Jeff Royer, tournament director, called Senecal to inform him that he had been disqualified for an improper application form by leaving his boat length blank. When asked to cite the rule for application omissions, Royer admitted there wasn't one, but he insisted that Senecal violated the rule that says boat classification changes can only be made prior to the start of fishing. However, the GJKT originally stated that he had not specified a class.
After witnessing public outrage on Sunday and Monday, the GJKT acknowledged some responsibility for the problem, and on Tuesday gave Senecal a prize equal to the one he had lost. He was also awarded first place in a special category. However, some of the anger was directed towards Don Combs, who did nothing wrong. On several websites, he was portrayed as a bad guy by individuals who were ignorant of the facts. The GJKT did nothing to restore Comb's reputation.

The second controversy occurred in 2019, when Randy Howell's 52.56-pound fish was initially accepted at the late weigh in despite a large bite from a shark. The tournament has a rule which excludes mutilated fish that have "any damage which impairs the fish's fighting ability", so the owner of the next biggest fish filed a protest. The rules committee looked at the damage and disqualified the fish ruling that the fish's "ability to fight was no longer absolute".

=== Master of ceremonies ===
Jim King was a popular and powerful Florida senator from Jacksonville, but he always found time for the GJKT and was the voice of the tournament for more than 25 years. His favorite spot was a seat where he could see the boats return to weigh their catch, and provide a humorous commentary. Jim Sutton, a reporter for the Florida Times-Union, wrote that "Jim King can talk for hours without noticeably taking a breath. He can be darn funny doing it, and he personally knows 80 percent of the captains and crews that hit the dock for weigh-ins."

After his death in July 2009, Sisters Creek Marina Park was renamed Jim King Park & Boat Ramp at Sisters Creek in King's honor.

=== Changes ===
The Late-2000s recession had an extreme impact on the sport marine industry. Job losses and cutbacks affected discretionary recreational spending more than most market segments. New boat sales were nil, so manufacturers cut their sponsorships. Some fisherman were forced to give up their boat ownership or team up with friends to save expenses. The tournament had not covered expenses since 2004 and had spent $200,000 of their reserve fund to compensate, so in 2009 the board of directors made drastic changes to daily activities to ensure the future of the event. Two paid positions, an executive director and assistant were both eliminated to save over $90K per year. Bob Gipson, one of the tournament founders, resigned from the board of directors and assumed the executive director position at no salary. He then examined virtually every facet of the operation to reduce expenses.

- The VIP tournament was dropped after 2008 because the board of directors resolved that the tournament should emphasize the average fisherman, not professionals in sponsored boats.
- The Liar's Tent, which in the past featured professional entertainers, was scaled back and uses local talent.
- The Boatshow has fewer participants. When Boater's World went out of business, their large display went with it.
- A big exhibitor tent was discontinued. Exhibitors once included government agencies, local & national businesses and organizations. The ones who return are assigned a 10-foot square piece of ground.
- Operation of the Boatique, which sells official tournament merchandise and souvenirs, was turned over to a private vendor; the tournament receives a percentage of sales.
- Vendors for the Food Festival were required to bid their services for the first time in 2008. Some long–time participants thought they were exempt and didn't bid or bid seriously, and were excluded from the event.
- The KidZone, a free children's play area, was discontinued due to high liability insurance costs and limited usage.

Kingfish

== Tournament ==
Professional and amateur anglers compete side by side for as much as $500,000 in cash and prizes, depending upon the total number of entries. The rules permit the registration of up to 1,000 boats, each with as many as four anglers, for an entry fee that was $400 in 2010. There are prizes for the heaviest single kingfish, pair of kingfish, and the largest cobia. Five kingfish caught in the week preceding the tournament are tagged, and there is a prize for catching them. Sponsors often offer prizes for the largest fish caught using their products. The tournament attracts approximately 20,000 spectators who watch the weigh-in and enjoy the festivities. The tournament is traditionally capped off with a substantial fireworks display sponsored by the City of Jacksonville.

Tournament winners
	Single Fish		Fish Group	
Year	Winner	Weight	Winner	Weight
1981	Paul Hanson	50.2	Gerald Beasly	135.4 (5)
1982	Jack Proctor	41.2	Walter Bates	78.1 (5)
1983	Ross Vilardo	48.5	Clayton Kirby	100.3 (5)
1984	Benny Hendrix	47.2	Brad Reed	118.2 (5)
1985	Jerry Byers	42.2	Roy Hawkins	114.6 (5)
1986	Michael Youngblood	50.7	Mark Williams	116.1 (5)
1987	Dennis Young	49.0	George Register	94.3 (5)
1988	Robert Bell	41.4	Daniel Parker	75.5 (3)
1989	Todd Crawford	47.9	John Jones	96.8 (3)
1990	Randy Smith	49.35	Clayton Kirby	88.35 (3)
1991	Clifton Lewis	49.4	Stephen Proctor	94.5 (3)
1992	Charles Newton	47.7	Dan Upton	108.05 (3)
1993	Douglas Sturm	48.75	Rick Smith	83.7 (3)
1994	Ron Gunter	42.7	Earl Clewis	77.6 (3)
1995	Fred Morrow	44.65	Robbie Sabiston	64.0 (2)
1996	Rick Raleigh	33.05	No qualifiers	
1997	Jack Conard	49.1	David Hamilton	72.3 (2)
1998	Bian Bushloper	48.25	David Ward	70.85 (2)
1999	Sandy Smith	52.55	Matt Pittman	68.6 (2)
2000	Ross Vilardo	53.3	Frank Strickland	62.5 (2)
2001	Mike Burch	42.65	David Murphy	68.4 (2)
2002	Tom Rady	55.2	?	
2003	Scott Routh	45.5	Clyde Keen	65.8 (2)
2004	Paul Dozier	46.0	Trip Fletcher	75.9 (2)
2005	Bill Rew	48.95	Richard Geiger	69.85 (2)
2006				
2007	James Croft	48.6	Don Combs	63.95
2008	Michael Crabtree	51.35	Ryan Rodeffer	73.80
2009	Benjamin Hinson	42.85	Greg Simmons	66.55
2010	Russell Stuart	45.75	Jerry Carter	68.15
2015	Kenny Crawford	44.15	Kevin Snyder	79.00
2019	Chris Jonsson	49.79	Tyler Smith	75.25
2020	Jack Lairsey	43.06	Larry Owens	41.46
2021	Spencer Ross	42.04	Scott Pope	73.85
2022	Joseph Shugart	49.77	Tommy Rady	71.63

=== VIP tournament ===
This event was always held the first day of the tournament week, matching celebrities, politicians & big contributors with knowledgeable fisherman for a one-day fun outing. It was discontinued in 2008 due to high operational expenses and limited benefit.

VIP winners
Year	Winner	Weight
1981	Joe Frazier	20.5
1982	Monroe Campbell	30.1
1983	Fred Holland	34.2
1984	Paul Hanson	36.6
1985	Robalo Fishing Team	23.6
1986	Donald Gowdy	46.5
1987	John Campbell	48.5
1988	John Jones	32.7
1989	Marvin Pate	40.5
1990	Bob Dunagan	44.45
1991	Ronnie Worsham	48.85
1992	Daniel Casino	40.1
1993	Bob Dunagan	44.35
1994	Jimmy Cox	43.2
1995	Chester Stokes	37.7
1996	Frank Strickland	37.85
1997	Gerald Pack	37.45
1998	David Workman	26.45
1999	Lowell Breeding	32.25
2000	Sandy Smith	40.6
2001	Ricky Raleigh	41.2
2002	No Tournament	
2003	Tony Benevento	38.9
2004	Kenny Crawford	40.5
2005	Kenny Crawford	40.9
2006		
2007		
2008		

=== Junior angler tournament ===
First held in 1991 for those under 16, it is a family event to promote good sportsmanship, conservation awareness and fun. The $10 (per angler) entrance fee has not changed since the Junior Angler tournament's inception, and prizes are awarded based on Kingfish weight. The boat used by the junior angler must be registered in the regular tournament.

Junior angler winners
Year	Winner	Weight
1991	Jeremy MacEwen	49.4
1992	Chris Newton	47.7
1993	Gabe Carlson	41.95
1994	Chris Wood	34.8
1995	Corey Hill	41.0
1996	Kevin Wood	42.25
1997	Crocker Stickney	43.9
1998	Dustin McIntire	26.95
1999	Sarah Pugh	29.65
2000	Casey Lands	36.8
2001	Andrew Hurst	37.99
2002	No Tournament	
2003	Hayley Craven	29.9
2004	Ross Crabtree	39.2
2005	Quint Wright	34.1
2006		
2007		
2008		
2009	Spencer LeSage	37.40
2010	Cody Powers	36.95
2015	Taylor Dollar	73.75
2020	Tucker Musgrove	43.19
2021		7.75

== Fish sale ==
All the fish caught and weighed become the property of the tournament, but they don't go to waste. Within minutes, they are gutted and iced down by Ed Thomas, a professional from Safe Harbor Seafood Market. They are shipped all over North America and consumed (mostly) by non-American ethnic groups who like the taste and low price (less than $2.75/lb). The tournament is paid just under $1 per pound for 5-8 tons of fish.

== Volunteers ==
The tournament relies on volunteers to maximize the proceeds available for charities. As many as 400 individuals donate their time to make the event a success. A few people have actually served in every previous contest.

The Walt Murr Award honors an outstanding volunteer during the annual Tournament. The award was established during 1987 in honor of the first tournament chairman, Walt Murr. The honoree is selected by the board of directors upon recommendation from the current tournament chairman and vice chairmen.

Murr Award recipients
Year	Winner
1987	Bob Medley
1988	Al & Joan Lancaster
1989	Pete Loftin
1990	Doodles Cinotti
1991	Edgar Ochs
1992	John Lees
1993	Brenda Ochs
1994	Jim Ingalls
1995	Carl DiSalvo
1996	Jimbo Crumley
1997	Joe Tomlinson
1998	Tom Fulmer
1999	Peggy Collins
2000	Harvey Rohn
2001	Ted Karst
2002	Sheryl Rohn
2003	Dennis Collins
2004	JoAnn Preston
2005	Charlie Smith
2006	Rita Contos
2007	John Edenfield
2008	Wally Brown
2009	Barry Lancaster
2010	John Laforge

== See also ==
- Angling
- Fishing
- Big-game fishing
- Sport Fishing
