= Shark Alliance =

Conservation organization

- Formation: 2006; 20 years ago
- Founder: Pew Charitable Trusts
- Type: Not-for-profit coalition
- Purpose: Restoring and conserving shark populations by improving shark conservation policies
- Region served: Global
- Members: 85 (2010)
- Website: Official website

The Shark Alliance was a global not-for-profit coalition founded in 2006 by Pew Charitable Trusts of non-governmental organizations dedicated to restoring and conserving shark populations by improving shark conservation policies. As of May 2010 the Shark Alliance consisted of 85 NGOs from over 35 countries.

== Purpose ==
The Shark Alliance was initiated and coordinated by the Pew Environment Group, the conservation arm of Pew Charitable Trusts, a non-government organization working to end overfishing in the world's oceans.

The mission of the Shark Alliance is to secure the following:

- Shark fishing limits in line with scientific advice and the precautionary approach, including stronger policies to prevent shark finning
- Safeguards and conservation guidance for sharks through the Convention on International Trade in Endangered Species (CITES)
- A United Nations Resolution that includes ambitious timelines for implementation of the International Plan of Action for Sharks and lays out consequences for inaction

The Shark Alliance concluded operations after the European Union established regulations to reduce shark finning and protect shark populations.

== Shark Week ==
To raise public awareness about the dramatic decline of shark species and Europe's role in the process, the Shark Alliance proclaimed 8–14 October 2007 to be the first European Shark Week. Using the slogan "Every Fin Counts!", members of the public were asked to take part in events and sign a petition asking the fisheries commission of the EU for better regulation to protect sharks. During European Shark Week over 100 events were organised around Europe by Shark Alliance members. At the end of the campaign, over 20,000 signatures were presented to the fisheries commission.

In 2010, the Shark Alliance's Shark Week expanded beyond Europe to include North and South America to raise public awareness around the globe.
