= Mormyshka =

Freshwater Shrimp

A Mormyshka (or Mormishka, or Marmooska, Russian: мормышка) is a type of fishing lure or a jig. The word is derived from the Russian word Mormysh (Russian: мормыш) meaning Freshwater Shrimp (Gammarus).

The mormyshka was invented in Russia during the 1860s. The prototypes were big spoon lures used for ice fishing. Trying to imitate shrimps, anglers made lures smaller and changed their method of fixing them on the line. These more efficient lures spread quickly among ice fishermen throughout Russia and Scandinavia.

Mormyshkas have a metallic head, often made of tungsten, and a hook soldered in it. There is a small vertical hole in the middle of the head where the line passes through.

The method for knotting mormyshkas to the line is unusual, but not difficult. The line is inserted through the hole and tied to the hook. Mormyshkas float in an almost horizontal position, and the point of the hook stays above its shank.

Some mormyshkas have a Bead Head on the hook.

In contrast to Jig Heads, original Russian mormyshka jigs have no up eye; Mormyshkas are not always spherical. There are many shapes that provide different presentations to fish; Usually, high quality mormyshkas are not painted, but coated or plated with nickel, brass, copper, gold, silver, or an alloy, which provides better attraction to fish.

In recent years mormyshkas have been used in summer fishing as well, with long poles and a float or a bobber. It is used either with live bait or alone. Also, anglers use palmers tied on mormyshkas.

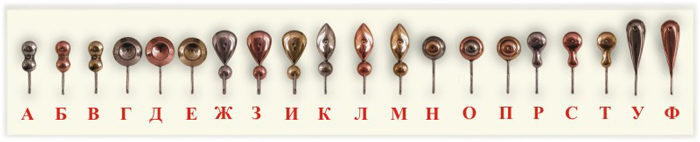
