= Adriënne Broeckman-Klinkhamer =

Dutch artist (1876–1976)

- Born: 4 December 1876; Amsterdam, the Netherlands
- Died: 12 April 1976 (aged 99); Velsen, The Netherlands
- Known for: painter
- Spouse: Anne Marinus Broeckman

Adriënne Broeckman-Klinkhamer (1876–1976) was a Dutch painter, illustrator, and textile artist.

== Biography ==
Broeckman-Klinkhamer née Klinkhamer was born on 4 December 1876 in Amsterdam, the seventh of ten children. She attended School voor Kunstnijverheid (Haarlem) (School for Arts and Crafts (Haarlem)) and Akademie van beeldende kunsten (Den Haag) (Royal Academy of Art, The Hague) Around 1908 she married fellow artist Anne Marinus Broeckman (1874–1946) with whom she had two children, one of whom, Elga Eymer, went on to become an artist. The couple settled in Laren in North Holland.

In 1915 Broeckman-Klinkhamer became one of the few women members of the Gooi artists association Club De Tien. She was also a member of Arti et Amicitiae, Kunstenaarsvereniging Sint Lucas, and Kunstenaarsvereniging Laren-Blaricum. Her work was included in the 1939 exhibition and sale Onze Kunst van Heden (Our Art of Today) at the Rijksmuseum in Amsterdam.

Broeckman-Klinkhamer died on 12 April 1976 in Velsen.
