= Centre of Marine Resource Management =

- Established: 2004
- Location: Tromsø, Norway
- Website: http://www.maremacentre.com

The Centre of Marine Resource Management or MaReMa Centre or simply MaReMa is an interdisciplinary research centre established by the Norwegian College of Fishery Science at University of Tromsø in 2004. The centre performs research within the area of fisheries and coastal zone management issues internationally, covering disciplines as resource biology, harvest technology, bioeconomics and social science.

== Location ==
MaReMa Centre
Norwegian College of Fishery Science
University of Tromsø
Breivika
N-9037 Tromsø
Norway

== See also ==
- Fisheries Centre
