= Yakima Klickitat Fisheries Project =

The Yakima Klickitat Fisheries Project (YKFP) is a salmon supplementation project in the Yakima and Klickitat river basins in Washington state designed to use artificial propagation in an attempt to maintain or increase natural production while maintaining long-term fitness of the target population and keeping ecological and genetic impacts to non-target species within specified limits. The project is also designed to provide harvest opportunities. The framework developed by the Regional Assessment of Supplementation Project (RASP 1991) guides the planning, implementation, and evaluation of the Project. YKFP is a collaboration of the Washington Department of Fish and Wildlife, the Bonneville Power Administration, and the Yakama Indian Nation.

The purposes of the YKFP are to:

- enhance existing stocks of anadromous fish in the Yakima and Klickitat river basins while maintaining genetic resources;
- reintroduce stocks formerly present in the basins; and
- apply knowledge gained about supplementation throughout the Columbia River Basin.
