= Shortfloating =

Fishing method

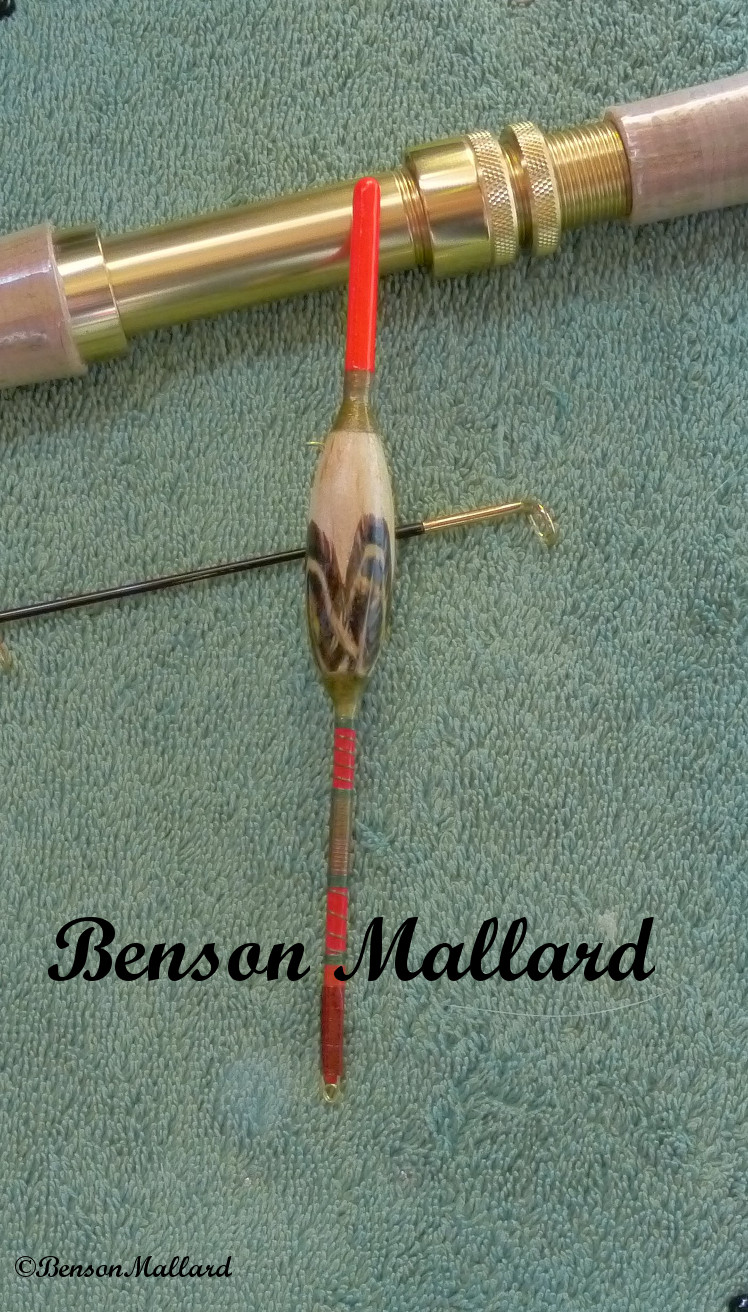
15mm Inlaid Feather River Stick. Silk whipped, sealed and varnished with bottom and mid body line loops.

Shortfloating or Short fishing is a fishing method that has been employed in running water by river anglers for many decades, and is also used by lake anglers. The method that allows the angler to selectively target species of fish by controlling hook length. Short floating is used in the river pools alongside runs, where resting fish have time to consider and take bait.

== Description ==
Short fishing methods controls the hook length from flotation device or bobber. A shorter hook length can be an advantage in the colder part of the season, although a bottom weight can have the same effect. Short fishing is a rig that entices fish that are opportunist feeders, as opposed to species like carp that tend to test their food, have a routine search route, and rarely take "on the drop", for which the long rig presented on the bottom is usually best.

== Use ==
The morphology of a river which is very complex and forever changing, making short float tactics effective for targeting species. Lake beds tends to be static in its geography, though fish targeting is still employed by lake anglers.

A river can be divided into sections known as runs and pools. Runs are medium- to fast-flowing sections while pools are slower, deeper sections. Short floating is used in the pools, where fish rest to conserve their energy as they move upstream. Short floating allows resting fish time to consider and take bait that is not going to rush away. Species such as chub may prefer disturbed water, and a stick float may be held against the flow to improve results.
