= Flesh fly (fly fishing) =

Fly fishing pattern

- Artificial fly
- Type: Flesh fly

Materials
- Typical sizes: 2-10
- Typical hooks: Almost any non-stainless hook
- Thread: White or pink
- Body: Non-crosscut striped rabbit in white, tan, cream, or “dirty sock”

Flesh Fly is a popular fly pattern used by rainbow trout anglers in Western Alaska. This particular fly fishing pattern is designed to mimic a chunk of rotten salmon flesh washing down stream. The pattern is usually tied using white or off white rabbit hair.
