= EconSimp =

Bioeconomic management model used in Barents Sea fisheries

EconSimp is a bioeconomic management model of the Barents Sea fisheries. It consists of two modules modelling respectively the Barents Sea ecosystem and the Norwegian fleet structure and activity. The ecosystem module is the multispecies model Aggmult developed at the Norwegian Institute of Marine Research and the fleet module is EconMult.
