= Sport Fishing and Boating Partnership Council =

The Sport Fishing and Boating Partnership Council is an 18-member committee established under the Federal Advisory Committee Act whose purpose is to advise the Secretary of the Interior, through the Director of the U.S. Fish and Wildlife Service, on recreational boating and fishing issues, and aquatic resource conservation issues of national concern.

== See also ==
- National Fish Habitat Partnership
