= Monterey clipper =

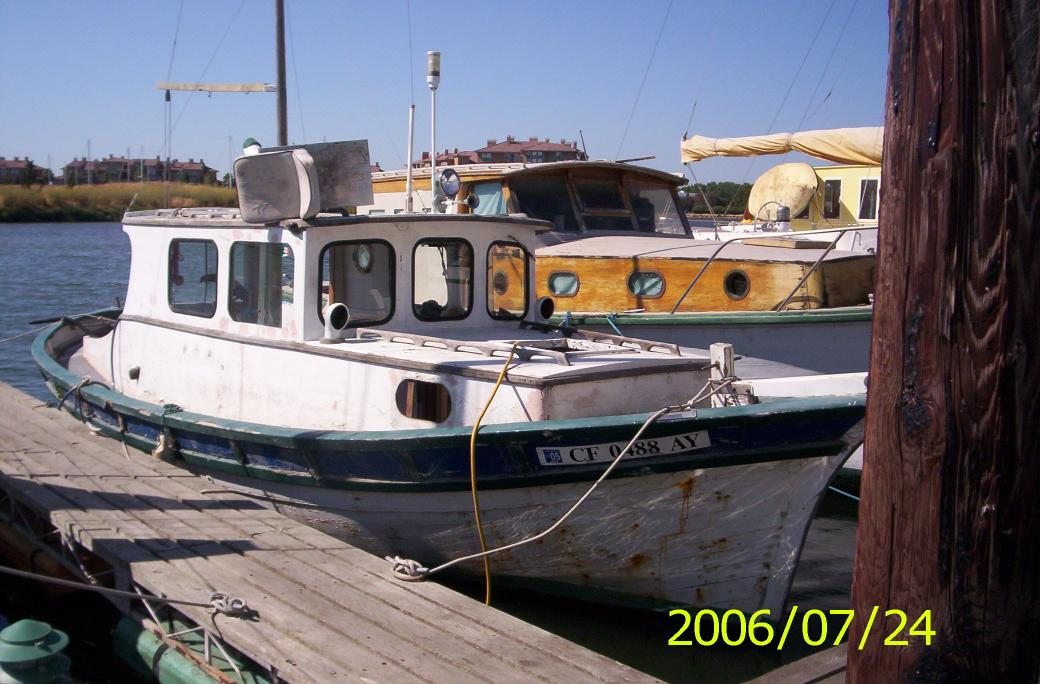
Monterey Clipper docked in a Redwood City, Ca Marina

The Monterey Clipper is a fishing boat common to the San Francisco Bay Area, the Monterey Bay Area and east to the Sacramento delta.

Known variously as a Monterey Hull, Putt-putt, Silena boat, and Lampra boat, the Monterey Clipper's history has swung with the fortunes of the local fish industry and the paces of industrialization. The original design comes from traditional lines modified with current efficiencies. This classic boat enjoys the fame and pride of families. It also continues to this day as a popular theme for postcards, noted artists, and patient hobbyists.

== History ==
The Monterey Clipper has long been considered part of the local fishing fleet to the San Francisco Bay Area, the Monterey Bay Area and east to the Sacramento delta. The original hull design was introduced into the area by Italians in the late 1860s. The design came from Genoese lateen-rigged sailboats, known as silenas, then later referred to as San Francisco feluccas.

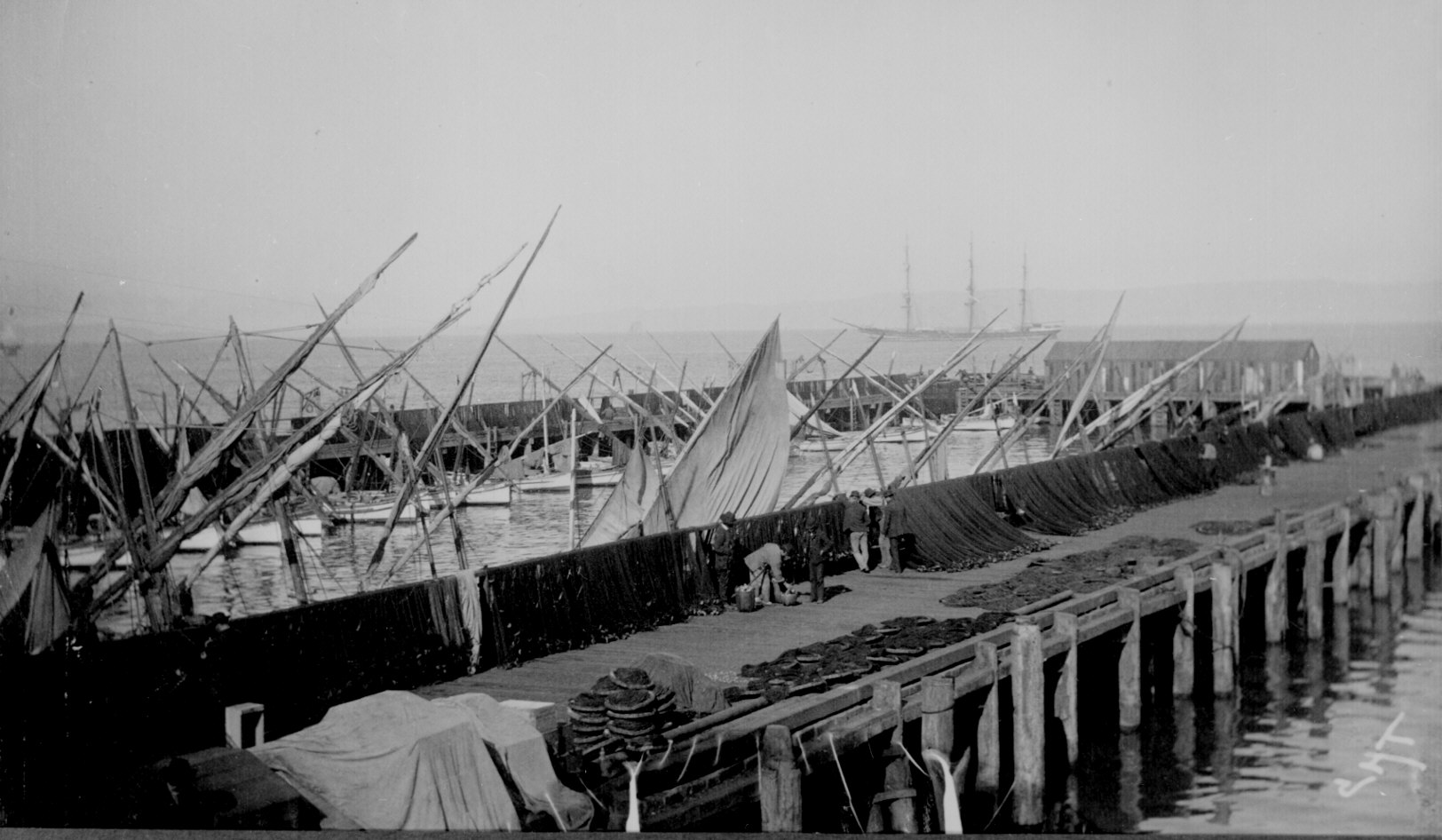
At Fishermen's Wharf, San Francisco, circular crab nets, large fish nets and feluccas protruding masts. 1891. Source: NARA

The feluccas were at first used to gather shrimp in the SF bay, but when this fishery was abandoned to the Chinese, they gillnetted for local bay fish, trolled for ocean fish, and pulled up the famous Dungeness crabs. During this period, they made up about two-thirds of the 85 or so fishing boats that served the city. Later, as the fleet grew, about 50 boats serviced just the crab fisheries. By 1890, there were about 1000 feluccas in the wharf.

The Monterey Clipper came into being with industrialization around 1925. The boat was improved with a small single-cylinder gasoline engine and amenities such that, "it could engage in multiple types of fishing and spend several days at sea". All total, around this period, about 500 of the small fishing boats were based in San Francisco. Companies like the Beviaqua yard and the Genoa Boat Works were instrumental in adding to the fleet.

By the 1930s, the local sardine industry came alive with more canneries built in San Francisco and Monterey. The Monterey Clipper was key in the development of this industry. This continued until the early 1950s "when the production and the exploitation of the fishery peaked". By this time, large vessels and the introduction of inventions like the Purse-Seiners reduced the fleet to about 200 in San Francisco.

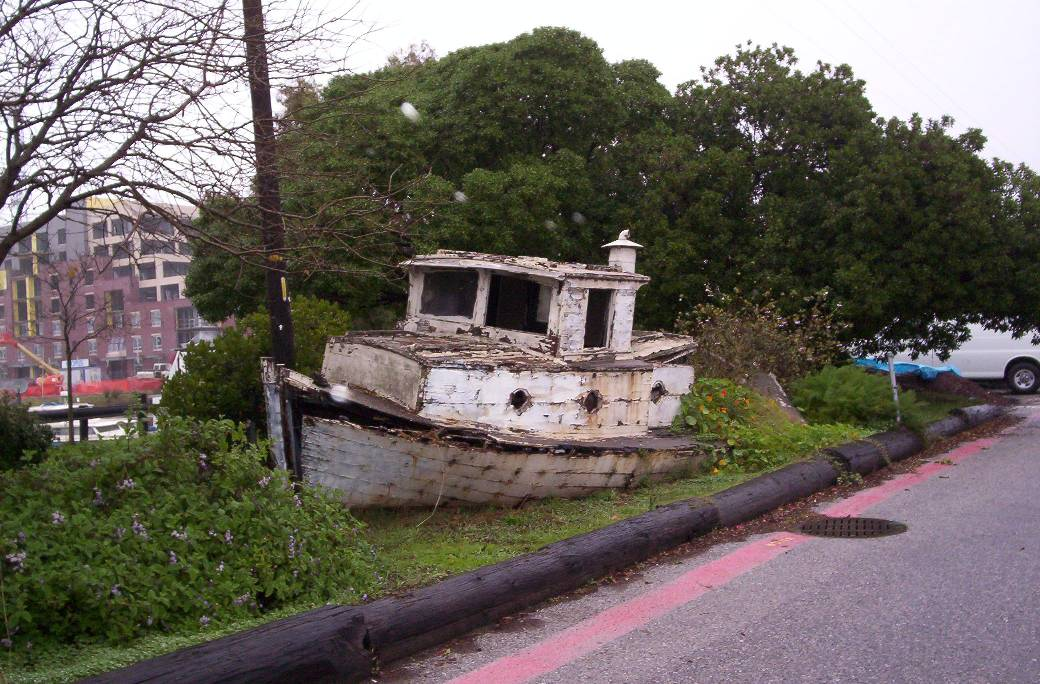
An abandoned Monterey Clipper being used as a planter at Mission Bay Inlet in San Francisco, California.

Today, this boat is too small, too slow, and inadequate for commercial fishing. In its day, it could support a family, and sometimes two, but it now serves mainly as a pleasure craft. These boats can be found as far north as Alaska and as far south as San Diego. In spite of its downturn, its value as a small craft continues to be seen in similar hulls built in other parts of the world such as South Africa, Chile, Egypt, and India.
