= Power pro =

Braided fishing line made from Spectra fiber

Power Pro a type of braided fishing line made out of a material called Spectra fibers. It has an equivalent diameter of nearly 1/5 of monofilament. Thus the diameter of a piece of Power Pro testing at 50 pounds is equivalent to monofilaments' diameter testing at around 12 pounds. It lacks stretch that monofilament has, giving the fisherman a better "feel" and also helps set the hook faster. Environmentalists have criticized the use of spectra fiber, as it takes a long time to degrade thus harming the environment. Spectra is a form of gel-spun polyethylene.

One note in using Power Pro, the drag has to be set at a much lighter strength than compared to monofilament due to the propensity for Power Pro to dig into itself while fighting large fish.
