= Bombarda =

Fishing float

Bombarda, or Sbirulino, is a type of weighted float used in rod and reel fishing. The main line is passed through the bombarda. The end of the main line is tied to a swivel, while the other end of the swivel is tied to a three to six-foot terminal line with hook. When cast, the bombarda sinks slowly, and at the same time, it is reeled in.

The rate of sinking and reeling-in speed, determines whether the area fished is surface, mid, or deep water. Presentation of bait is very natural. It can be used during the day and also at night with appropriate baits and in both fresh and seawater. There are various casting weights ranging from 5 to 30 grams. The direction of sinking action can be forward, horizontal or even backward, when tension on the main line is absent.

The Sbirolino is often used for fishing in trout lakes and ponds.
