= Lobster hook =

Implement for extracting lobsters from holes

A lobster hook or lobsterhook is a hook with a handle (often home-made from a length of thick, stiff wire) used to encourage crabs and lobsters to come out of their holes when scuba diving or when searching among rocks in the dry at low tide. Some lobster hook designs are used to irritate the crustaceans, and some are designed to snag them.
