= Kaj Busch =

Australian journalist

Kaj (Bushy) Busch is an Australian sports fishing writer and television personality who has appeared in many of Rex Hunt's Fishing Adventure programs on the Seven Network.

He is saltwater editor of the Fly Life magazine, a columnist for NSW Fishing monthly, a regular presenter of the ABC Radio's "Gone Fishin" show and a prolific writer, photographer and guest speaker with a high profile throughout Australia and New Zealand.

He has also written feature articles and columns for a dozen or more magazines and is the author of a successful book entitled Fishing the Sapphire Coast of NSW.
