= Deadsticking =

Fishing technique

While fishing, generally for black bass, deadsticking is the act of presenting a soft plastic lure either by casting or a vertical drop and allowing the bait to remain motionless for an extended period time before retrieval.
