= Klinkhammer =

Fly fishing bait

- Artificial fly
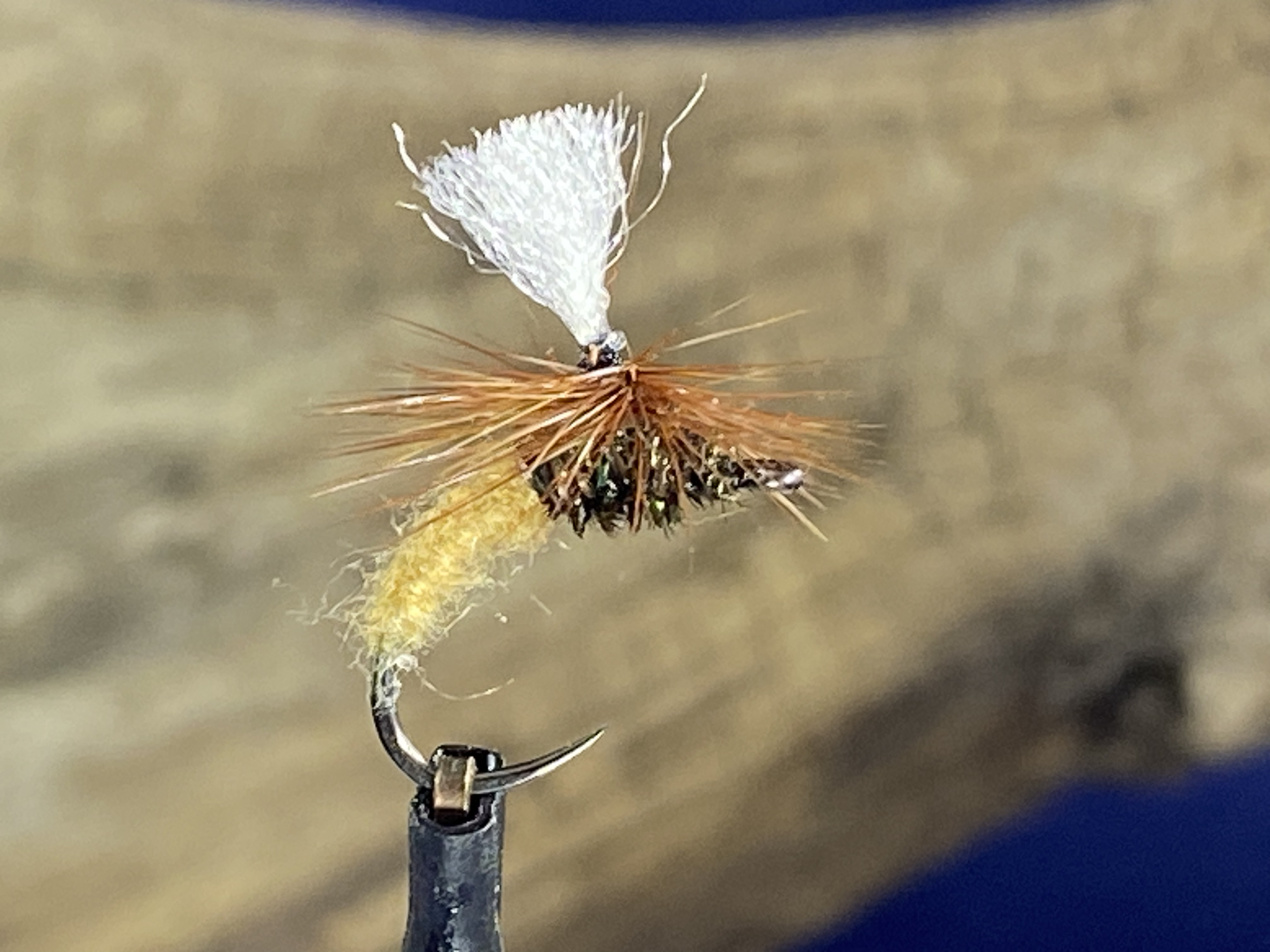
- Klinkhammer Special - replica of original as tied by Hans van Klinken
- Type: emerger
- Imitates: Caddisfly

History
- Creator: Hans van Klinken
- Created: early 1980s
- Other names: LT Caddis

Materials
- Typical sizes: 8–20
- Typical hooks: Klinkhammer

Uses
- Primary use: trout
- Other uses: grayling

Reference(s)
- Pattern references: Klinkhammer

The Klinkhammer, also known as Klinkhåmer or Klinkhamer, is a popular parachute style emerger used in fly fishing to catch grayling and trout. It is most popular within Europe, but has a growing interest in North America.

== History ==
The Klinkhammer, originally named LT Caddis (light tan), now officially named Klinkhåmer Special, was devised by a Dutch angler Hans van Klinken in the early 80's to imitate an emerging caddisfly to catch grayling and trout which feed from them as they float in the surface film. This pattern has proven to be an extremely effective fly.

== Style ==
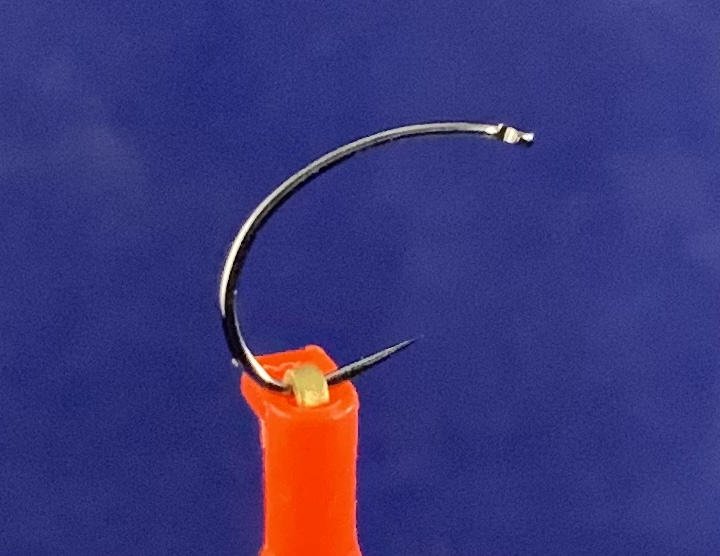
Typical Klinkhammer style fly hook

The Klinkhammer style is different from many other parachute dry flies in that the thorax of the fly is designed to hang down 'through' the surface of the water to imitate an emerging insect trying to break through the surface tension. The style has been adapted to a wide variety of emerging mayfly and caddis species.

The abdomen serves as a trigger point which penetrates the surface film, which gets noticed by trout from great distances, even before any resulting surface footprint features.

In all variations of this fly, the abdomen and tail of the fly lies underneath the surface of the water to attract the fish and improve hookups, while the parachute hackle, thorax and foam or wing is on or above the surface of the water for visibility and flotation.
