= Stephen Bowen (biologist) =

American biologist, educator, and educational administrator

Stephen Bowen is an American biologist, educator, and educational administrator. From August 2005 until his retirement in May 2016, he served as the Dean and CEO of Oxford College of Emory University, located in Oxford, Georgia.

== Early life and education ==
Bowen received his bachelor's degree in 1971 from Depauw University. He earned an M.A. from Indiana University in 1973 and his Ph.D. from Rhodes University in Grahamstown, South Africa in 1976.

== Career ==
Bowen's biological research has focused primarily on the ecology of fishes. He has published widely on diet and digestion in a number of aquatic species, the nutritional value of organic detritus and biofilm, and fish population dynamics. His work has been supported by the National Science Foundation, the Michigan Sea Grant Program, the Great Lakes Fishery Commission, the United Nations Food and Agriculture Organization, among other agencies. He has been designated a certified fisheries biologist by the American Fisheries Society. Bowen also served as a senior fellow at the Association of American Colleges and Universities.

Beginning in 1978, he joined the faculty of Michigan Technological University as an assistant professor. He later became head of the Department of Biological Sciences, then an associate dean, vice provost, interim provost, and finally in 2000 vice provost for instruction and distance learning. In 2001, he became provost and vice president for academic affairs at Bucknell University.

== Personal life ==
Bowen has been married to his wife Nancy since 1973. They have three children: Gabriel, Matthew, and April. After retiring from Emory University in 2016, he and his wife now reside in Grand Haven.
