= Hair rig =

Fishing method

A knotless knot joining a fishing line (blue) to a fishing hook (grey) and a hair rig (orange)

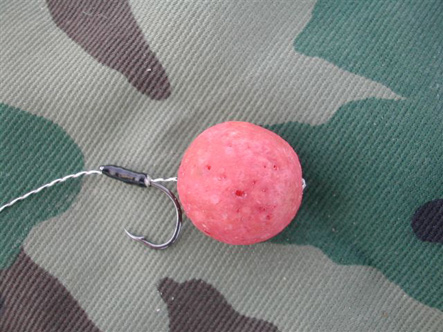
Hair rig

The Hair rig is a fishing method which allows a bait to be presented without sitting directly on the hook. It is mainly associated with boilies, but also works effectively with many other baits. The Hair-Rig became popular in the 1980s and was the joint invention of Len Middleton and Kevin Maddocks.

It has been experimented with by many anglers, and has revolutionised carp fishing.

At the beginning, natural hair from Len's wife's head was used because Len's own hair was far too curly. Hence the name, "hair-rig", to attach the bait to the hook after many 'tank test' experiments with captive carp carried out in Len's home. Before that all sorts of other materials were tried but human hair worked from the start. Human hair was very discreet and the carp seemed unaware of it when picking up bait attached to it, and also taking in the hook, but it was a little fragile. In tests, the carp only took the free offerings and left the hook bait if the bait was not attached to a 'hair'. Human hair was also a problem because anglers sometimes lost their baits when casting. These problems have been solved with the appearance of braided thread, a new material that allows threads to be as discreet as natural ones but more resistant to breaking. However, many believe, that the whole concept works because the hook is not buried in the bait, as when fishing for other fish species, and due to the carp`s feeding method of sucking and blowing, the sharp hook point catches in the mouth or lips. A heavy semi-fixed lead sinker (2 ozs upwards) then pulls the hook into the flesh and usually the fish bolts off in alarm, so this is a very effective self-hooking rig, with no need for the angler to 'strike' as in the past. Many variations of the 'Hair-Rig' are now used by carp anglers and most of these are not like original 'hairs' at all, but 'Hook Out' rigs designed to allow the bare hook to catch in the mouth or lips.
