= Norwegian College of Fishery Science =

Norwegian academic institution

Coordinates: 69°40′58.19″N 18°58′24.49″E

- Norges fiskerihøgskole
- Established: 1972
- Location: Tromsø, Norway
- Website: en.uit.no/enhet/nfh/omoss

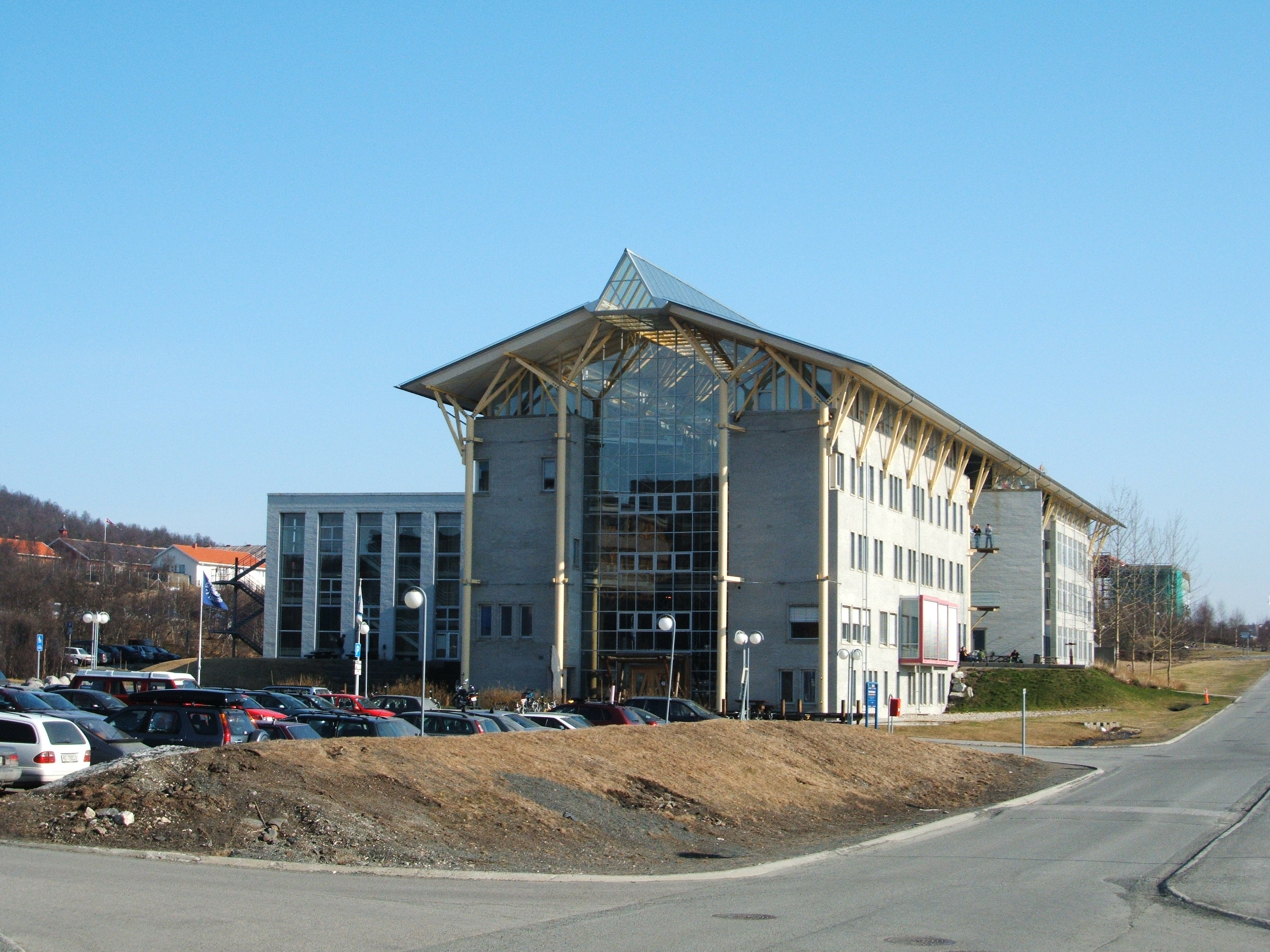
Norwegian College of Fishery Science building in Tromsø

The Norwegian College of Fishery Science (NCFS or in Norwegian NFH: Norges fiskerihøgskole) was established in 1972 as a joint responsibility of the three Norwegian universities in Tromsø, Bergen and Trondheim. In 1988, a new organisational structure was introduced as NCFS was located to Tromsø and organized as a faculty at the University of Tromsø, keeping some degree of autonomy as its own rector etc. NCFS has a particular responsibility for the development of fundamental and scientific expertise within all areas of fisheries and aquaculture research in Norway. NCFS is also responsible for educating candidates for employment in the fishing industry and fisheries management.

In 2004, NCFS established Centre of Marine Resource Management, also known as the MaReMa Centre, to promote multidisciplinary research in the area of fisheries and coastal zone management.

== Departments ==
- Department of Aquatic Biosciences
- Department of Marine Biotechnology
- Department of Economics
- Department of Social Science and Marketing
