= Boilie =

Type of fishing bait

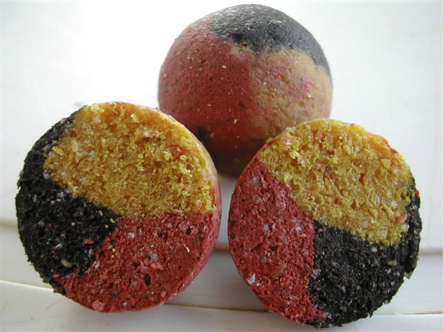
Boilies

Boilies are a type of artificial fishing bait made from boiled paste that usually consists of fishmeals, milk proteins, bird foods, semolina and soya flour, which are mixed with egg white as a binding agent. The mixture is then boiled to form hard, round balls that diffuse evenly and slowly in water, and additional flavourings and aromatic attractants are usually included in the mixture to enhance the olfactory appeal to the fish. The spherical shape also allows the baits to be catapulted accurately when fishing at distant waters.

Though boilies are typically made and sold by large commercial suppliers, many anglers opt to make their own unique homemade boilies.

== Use ==
Boilies are one of the most established carp fishing baits, available in a huge range of colours and flavours. Boilies come in all different shapes and sizes from tiny micro-boilies as small as 8 mm (0.31 in) to palm-sized balls as large as 40 mm (1.6 in), which are more suited to waters where "nuisance fish" are present. The ability to provide a bait of a fairly large size with a hard outer skin, meant that other species such as tench and bream were less able to consume the bait. Boiled baits also meant that they could be left longer in the water without fear of the bait disintegrating and falling off the hook, unlike bread or other traditional fishing baits.

There are also buoyant boilies, commonly known as "pop-ups", that are used to make the bait float just off the bed of the lake, making them easier for the fish to find and take. Pop-up boilies can be used in various situations, where there is weed or silt present on a lake bed, or with a normal boilie to create a "snowman" rig. The pop-up is generally smaller than the normal boilie, which creates what is known as a critically balanced bait, or neutral buoyancy, and makes it easier for the fish to take in the bait.

Carp anglers have many types of boiled bait to choose from, some of which have added preservatives in them so that they can be kept at room temperature on shop shelves for a long time (shelf-life bait). Boilies that lack these added preservatives need to be refrigerated or frozen to stop them from going off; these are known as freezer baits. There have been many arguments discussing the pros and cons of both freezer and shelf-life boilies but the common opinion of many carp anglers is that due to the artificial preservatives in shelf-life baits they are not as nutritionally beneficial to the carp and therefore lack some attraction. Also, since in order to keep freezer baits fresh they need to be frozen soon after being rolled, not only will the ingredients used be of a much higher quality than in shelf lives but the ingredients used to make them will not lose much of their nutrients and attraction before being used in a fishing situation (much like frozen vegetables). Due to these facts freezer baits are often much more expensive than their shelf life counterparts.

The most commonly used set-up anglers use to present a boilie is a hair rig (the bait is not attached directly to the hook) which allows the boilie to sit off the back of the hook. This not only means that the bait will behave more naturally in the water (for example when disturbed by feeding fish) it also will often make the difference between a good hook hold and a bad one. Due to the nature in which a carp feeds the bait is blown out of the mouth soon after it has been picked up and the fact that the bait can move independently from the hook it allows the hook to stay back inside the mouth and find its way preferably into the bottom lip.

== See also ==
- Fish food
- Groundbait
