= Angling records in the United Kingdom =

Freshwater record fish gallery

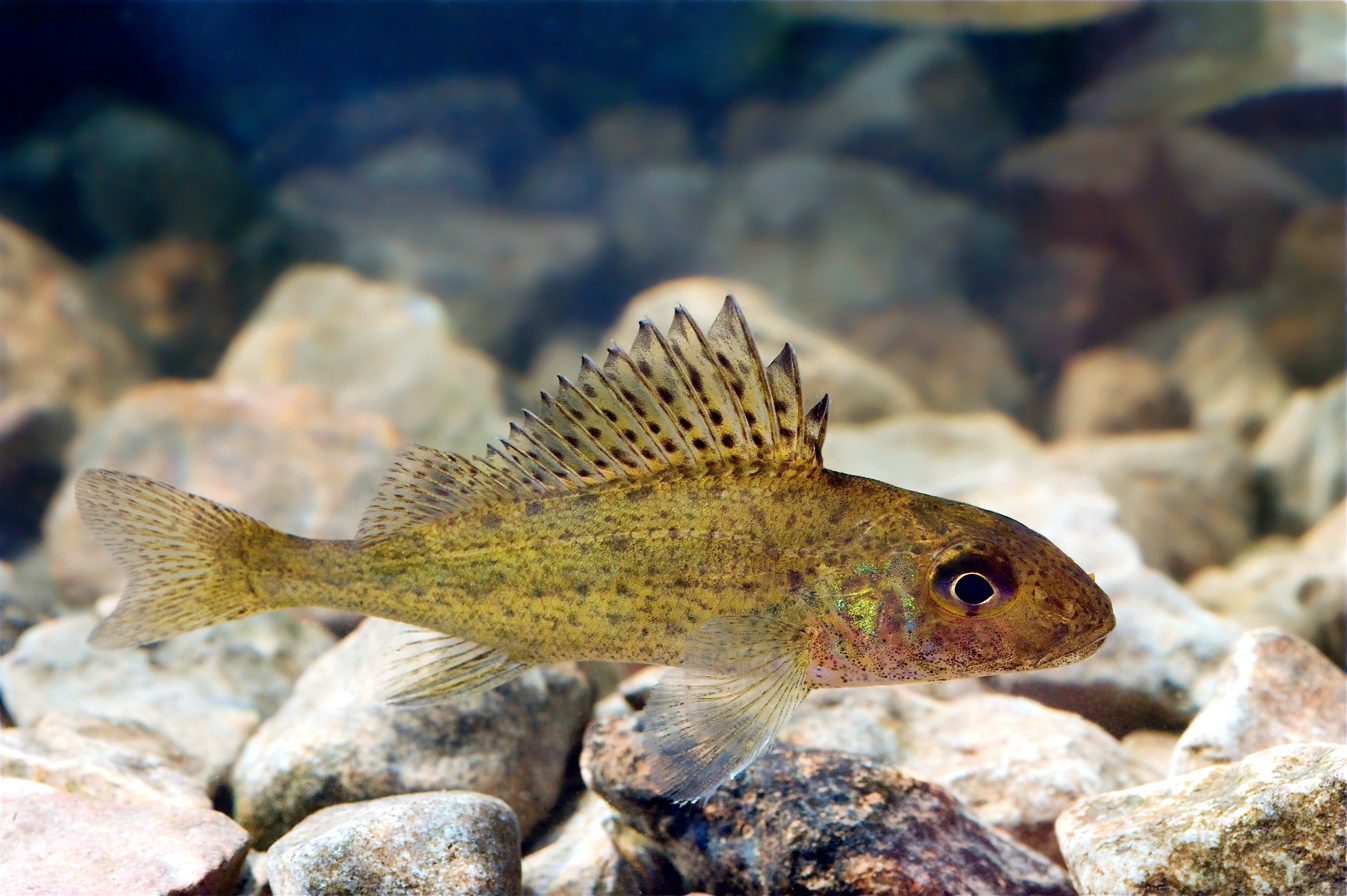
Ruffe (Gymnocephalus cernua)

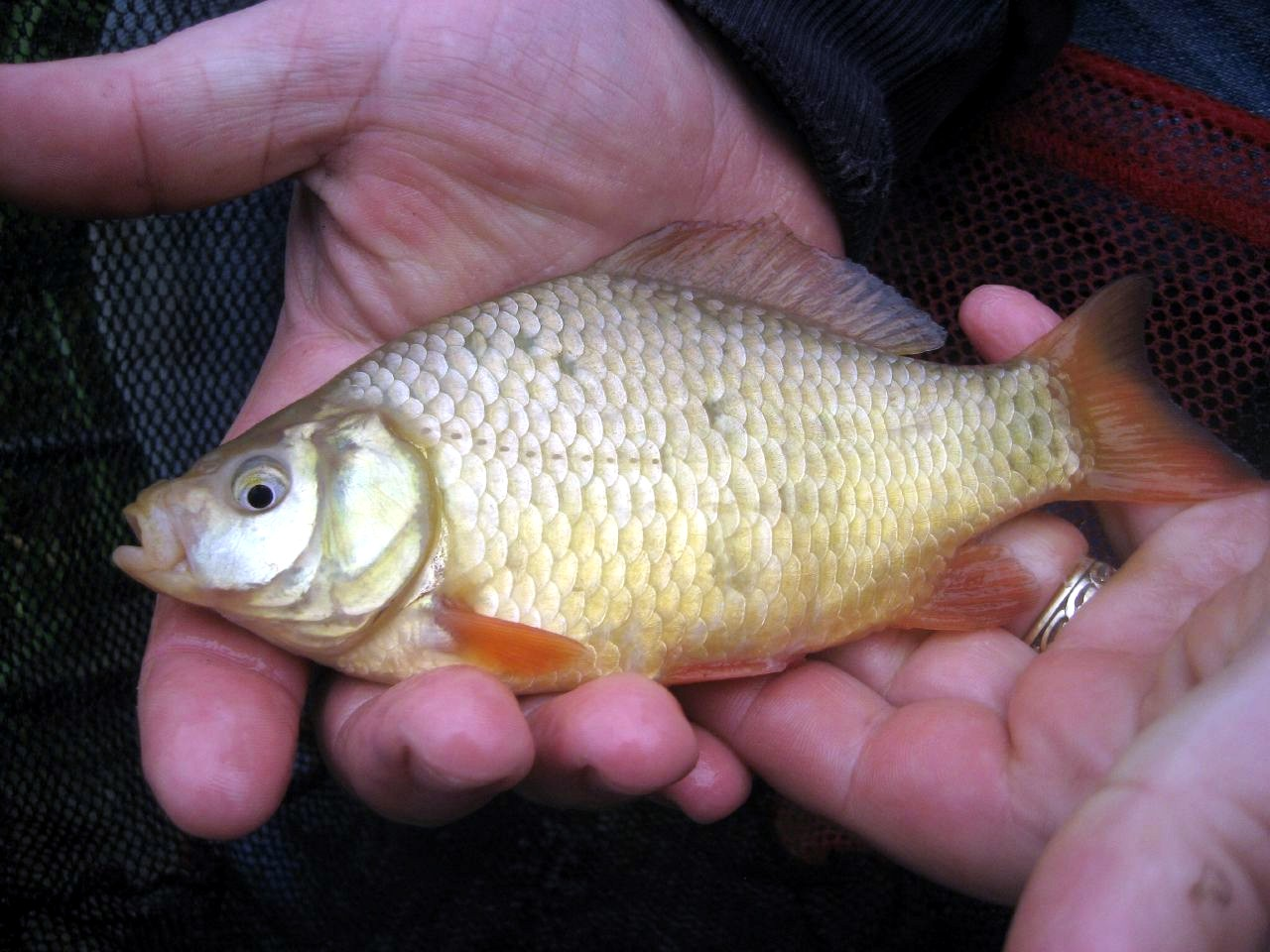
Crucian carp (Carassius carassius)

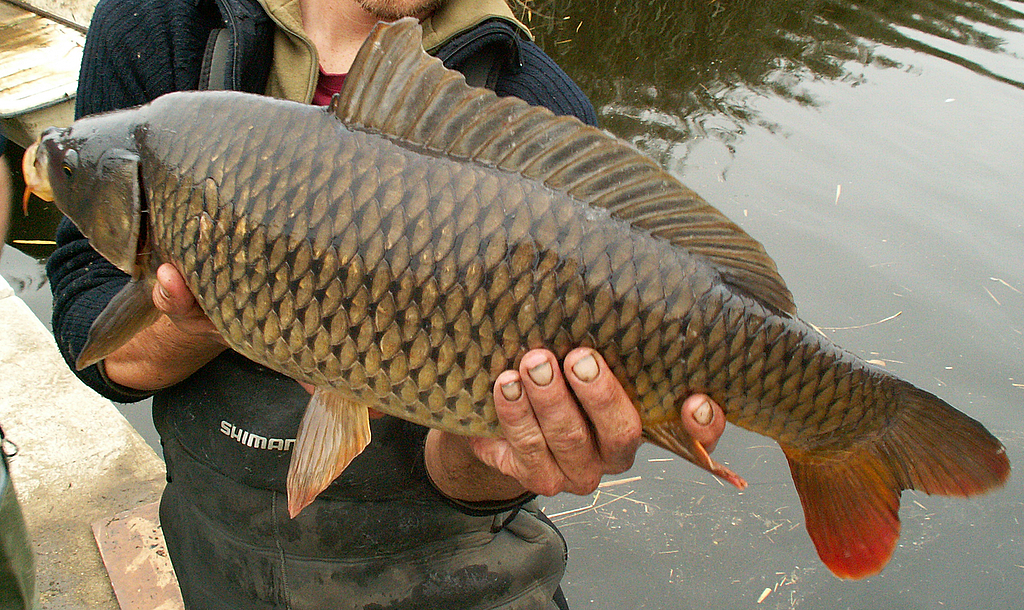
Common carp

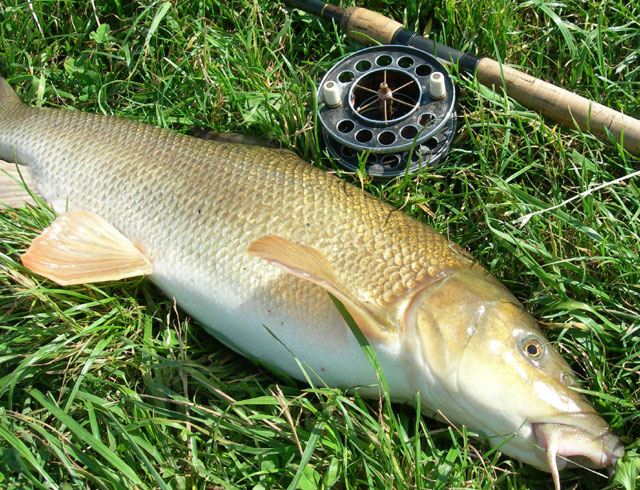
Barbel (Barbus barbus)

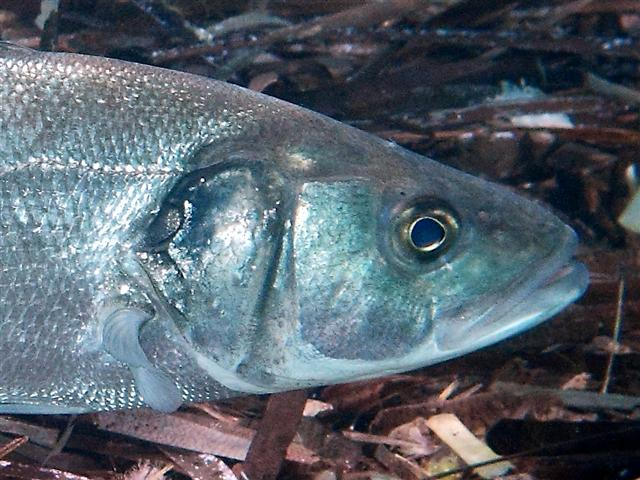
Sea Bass (Dicentrarchus labrax)

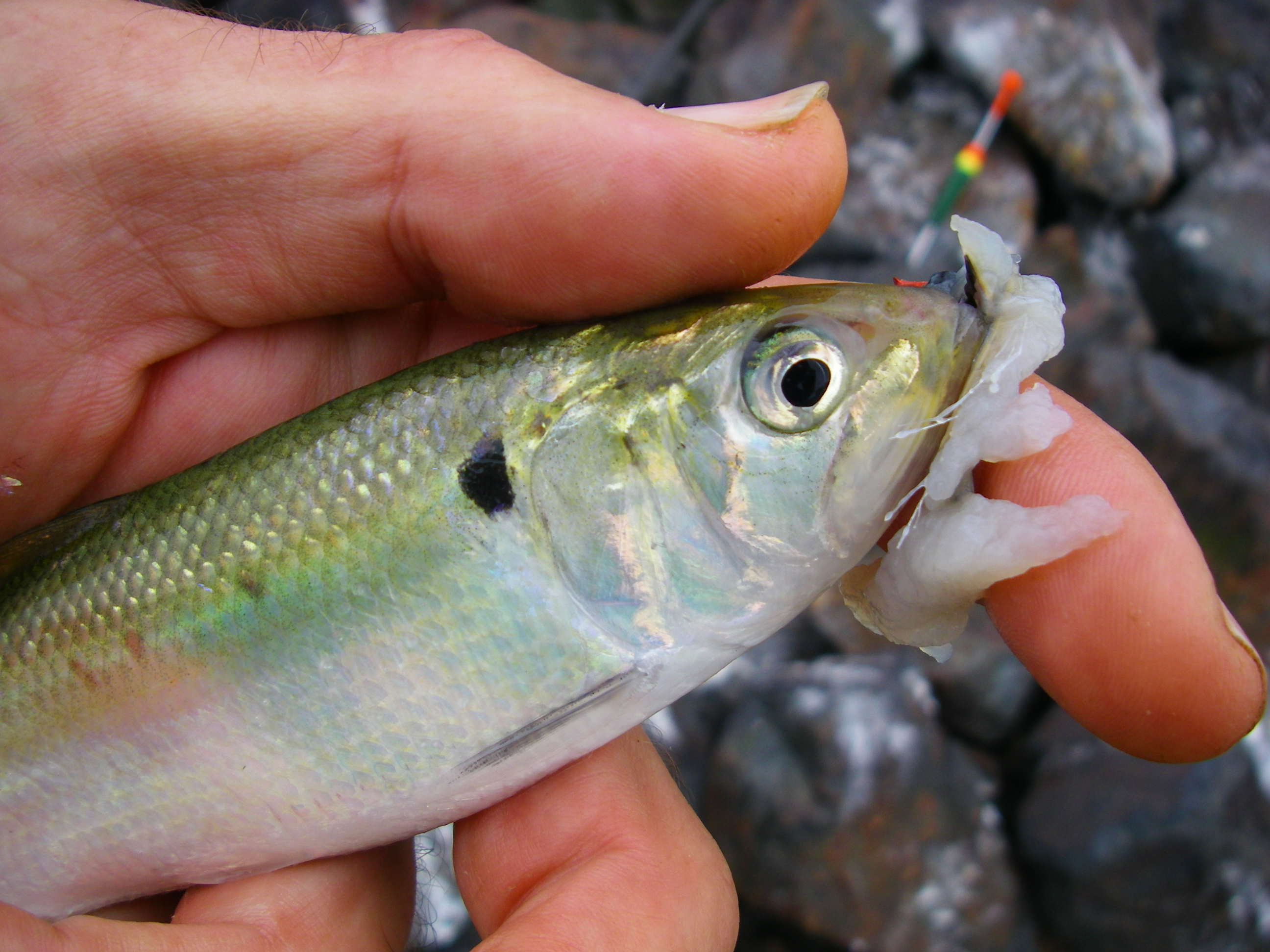
Allis shad (Alosa alosa)

This is an impartial (not implicitly biased to a single governing body, the BRFC) and comprehensive record list of 327 British record fish caught in freshwater, past and present, involving 64 species/sub-species of fish caught using the traditional angling method of rod and line. Records include the angler, species, weight, date, venue, also referenced with a recognizable publication. The list is intended to include all categories of fish caught by anglers, that enter freshwater including (coarse and game fish) and some migratory sea fish. The time since last record fish was caught is 190 days.

== Current records supported by photographic evidence ==
Image	Species	Weight (lb oz)	Captor	Date	Water	County	Time record held	References/ Notes
	Barbel (Barbus barbus)	22 lb 10 oz	Nathan Buckingham	14 February 2026	Fishers Green Complex, River Lea, Waltham Abbey	Essex	276 days	
	Bream (common or bronze) (Abramis brama)	22 lb 11 oz	Scot Crook	7 April 2012	Ferry Lagoon, Fen Drayton Lakes	Cambridgeshire	14 years, 224 days	Note 1
	Bream (silver) (Blicca bjoerkna)	3 lb 4;oz	Gareth Evans	21 May 2012	Mill Farm Fishery, Bury, near Pulborough	West Sussex	14 years, 180 days	
	Carp, common (Cyprinus carpio {communia})	68 lb 8 oz	Michael Nixon	24 April 2026	Kingfisher Lake, Chesham	Buckinghamshire	207 days	* Note 8
	Carp, leather (Cyprinus carpio {corium})	54 lb 8 oz	Steve Fudge	2006	Car Park Lake, Yateley Complex, Yateley	Surrey	16 years	* Note 8
	Carp, mirror (Cyprinus carpio {speculo})	75 lb 2 oz	Wayne Mansford	12 October 2020	Meadows Lake, Holme Fen Fishery	Cambridgeshire	6 years, 36 days	* Note 8
	Chub (Squalius cephalus)	9 lb 5 oz	Neill Stephen	16 March 2012	Fishers Green Complex, River Lea, Waltham Abbey	Essex	14 years, 246 days	* Note 9
	Crucian carp (Carassius carassius)	4 lb 15 oz	Martin Chew	11 May 2026	RH Fisheries, Weston Park, Weston-under-Lizard	Staffordshire	190 days	* Note 8
	Grass carp (Ctenopharyngodon idella)	57 lb 4 oz	Kane Hammond	4 Aug 2025	St.Georges Lake, Shepperton	Surrey	1 year, 105 days	* Note 8
	Grayling (Thymallus thymallus)	4 lb 8 oz	Simon Ellis	19 February 2019	River Frome, Ilsington near Puddletown	Dorset	7 years, 271 days	
	Golden orfe (Leuciscus idus)	8 lb 5 oz	Michael Wilkinson	April 2000	Lymm Vale	Cheshire	25 years, 215 days	
	Golden orfe (Leuciscus idus)	8 lb 5 oz	Lawrence King	20 May 2018	Newdigate farms, Newdigate	Surrey	8 years, 181 days	
	Ide (natural) (Leuciscus idus)	8 lb 5 oz	Colin Hebb	5 February 2021	River Hull	Yorkshire	5 years, 275 days	
	Mullet (thin-lipped grey) (Liza ramada)	7 lb 9 oz	Shaun Sillett	20 August 2012	Oulton Broad, Lowestoft	Suffolk	14 years, 89 days	Note 1 * Note 8
	Perch (Perca fluviatilis)	6 lb 3 oz	Neill Stephen	12 March 2011	Stream Valley Lakes, Crowborough	East Sussex	15 years, 250 days	
	Perch (Perca fluviatilis)	6 lb 3 oz	Ken Brown	18 Sept 2012	Wilstone Reservoir, Tring Reservoirs	Hertfordshire	14 years, 60 days	
	Pike (Esox lucius)	47 lb 5 oz	Lloyd Watson	13 February 2024	Chew Valley Lake, Chew Valley,	Somerset	2 years, 277 days	
	Roach (Rutilus rutilus)	4 lb 3 oz	Dai Gribble	24 May 2024	Brasenose 1, Linear Fisheries	Oxfordshire	2 years, 177 days	
	Roach (Rutilus rutilus)	4 lb 3 oz	Ken Fuller	15 May 2017	Homersfield Lake	Norfolk	9 years, 186 days	
	Salmon, Atlantic (Salmo salar)	64 lb	Miss Georgina W Ballantine	7 October 1922	River Tay, Glendelvine	Perthshire, Scotland	104 years, 41 days	
	Sea Bass (Dicentrarchus labrax)	10 lb	Jacob Cluskey	18 October 2025	Hampshire Avon	Dorset	1 year, 30 days	* Note 8
	Stickleback (3-spined) (Gasterosteus aculeatus)	8 grams (4.5 dr)	Matt Faulkner	July 2019	Lower Beauvale Ponds, Eastwood	Nottinghamshire	7 years, 125 days	
	Tench (Tinca tinca)	15 lb 3 oz 6 dr	Darren Ward	June 2001	Sheepwalk big pit, Shepperton	Middlesex	25 years, 150 days	Note 1
	Trout, brown (Salmo trutta)	31 lb 12 oz	Brian Rutland	15 March 2002	Loch Awe, Ardbrecknish	Argyll, Scotland	24 years, 246 days	
	Trout, rainbow (Onchorhynchus mykiss)	34 lb 12 oz	Michael Mitchell	2 October 2016	Loch Earn	Perthshire, Scotland	10 years, 46 days	* Note 8
	Wels catfish (Silurus glanis)	150 lb	Shaun Ing	30 September 2024	Chigborough Fisheries, Maldon	Essex	2 years, 48 days	
	Zander (Sander lucioperca)	22 lb	Mick Dolan	12 March 2010	Grafham Water, Huntingdon	Cambridgeshire	16 years, 250 days	* Note 8

== Current records not supported by any photographic evidence ==
Image	Species	Weight (lb oz)	Captor	Date	Water	County	Time record held	References/ Notes
	Arctic char (Salvelinus alpinus)	9 lb 8 oz	W Fairbairn	27 May 1995	Loch Arkaig, Inverness	Scottish Highlands, Scotland	31 years, 174 days	* Note 10
	Bleak (Alburnus alburnus)	4 oz 9 dr	Dennis Flack	1998	River Lark	Border of Suffolk and Cambridgeshire	22 years	* Note 10
	Bullhead (millers thumb) (Cottus gobio)	1 oz	R Johnson	16 January 1983	Green river, Bramley, Shamley Green (near Guildford)	Surrey	43 years, 305 days	* Note 10
	Dace (Leuciscus leuciscus)	1 lb 5 oz 2 dr	Simon Ashton	11 August 2002	River Wear, Town centre stretch, Durham	Co.Durham	24 years, 98 days	* Note 10
	Gudgeon (Gobio gobio)	5 oz	D H Hull	1990	River Nadder, Sutton Mandeville	Wiltshire	32 years	Note 1 * Note 10
	Minnow (Phoxinus phoxinus)	13.5 dr (24 grams)	James Sawyer	1998	Whitworth Lake, Spennymoor	Co.Durham	24 years	Note 1* Note 10
	Rudd (Scardinius erythrophthalmus)	4 lb 10 oz	Simon Parry	7 October 2001	Clay Lake	County Armagh, Northern Ireland	25 years, 41 days	* Note 10
	Ruffe (pope) (Gymnocephalus cernua)	5 oz 5 dr (150 grams)	Cayden Grimes	5 November 2026	Shropshire Union Canal	Staffordshire	12 days	* Note 8
	Ruffe (pope) (Gymnocephalus cernua)	5 oz 4 dr (149 grams)	R Jenkins	7 August 1980	West View Lake	Cumbria	46 years, 102 days	* Note 10
	Salmon, Pacific humpback (Oncorhynchus gorbuscha)	3 lb 8 oz 12 dr	Louis Hunter	2007	River Tweed, near Berwick-upon-Tweed	Scottish Borders, Scotland	15 years	* Note 10
	Stone loach (Barbatula barbatula)	13 dr	Geoffery Green	1 November 2005	Windmill Fishery, Bristol	Bristol	21 years, 16 days	Note 1* Note 10
	Trout, brook (Salvelinus fontinalis)	8 lb 3 oz	E Holland	1998	Fontburn Reservoir	Northumberland	24 years	* Note 10
	Trout, sea (Salmo trutta {migrantis})	28 lb 5 oz 4 dr	J Farrent	1992	Calshot Spit, River Test	Hampshire	30 years	* Note 10

== Record endangered species ==
Image	Species	Weight (lb oz)	Captor	Date	Water	County	Time record held	References/ Notes
	Allis shad (Alosa alosa) Note 3.	2 lb	Will Birch	1 June 2025	Devon River	Devon	1 year, 169 days	* Note 8
	Burbot (Lota lota) in UK only - see Note 3.	1 lb	John Dean	14 Sept 1969	Old West River (Great Ouse), near Aldreth	Cambridgeshire	57 years, 58 days	* Note 8
	Eel (Anguilla anguilla) Note 3.	11 lb 3 oz	Steve Ricketts	3 June 2024	Kent Lake	Kent	2 years, 167 days	
	Gwyniad (Coregonus pennantii) Note 3. (UK only)	1 lb 4 oz	J Williams	1965	Bala Lake (Llyn Tegid), Bala	Gwynedd, Wales	61 years, 125 days	Note 1
	Pollan (Coregonus autumnalis pollan) Note 3	No record found	-	-	-	-	-	
	Powan (Coregonus clupeoides) Note 3	3 lb	Robert Fullerton	24 August 2006	Carron Valley Reservoir, Nr. Denny	Stirlingshire, Scotland	20 years, 85 days	Note 1 * Note 8
	Schelly (skelly) (Coregonus stigmaticus) Note 3	2 lb 1 oz 9 dr	S M Barrie	24 Sept 1986	Haweswater Reservoir, Valley of Mardale	Cumbria	40 years, 54 days	Note 1
	Smelt (Osmerus eperlanus) Note 3	1 dr	Peter Christian	9 January 1977	River Yare, Buckenham Ferry	Norfolk	49 years, 312 days	* Note 8
	Atlantic sturgeon (Acipenser oxyrinchus oxyrinchus) Note 3.	202 lb 13 oz	Major C.R.E. Radclyffe	2 July 1911	River Frome, Bindon Mill	Dorset	115 years, 138 days	* Note 8
	European sturgeon (Acipenser sturio) Note 3.	388 lb	Alec Allen	1932	River Towy, Nantgaredig	Carmarthenshire, Wales	94 years, 115 days	Note 1 * Note 8
	Vendace (Coregonus albula) Note 3. (UK only)	4 oz 9 dm	John Nicol	2015	South Loch Earn Caravan Park, Loch Earn	Perthshire, Scotland	21 years, 125 days	* Note 8

== Record ornamental sub-species ==
Image	Sub-species	Weight (lb oz)	Captor	Date	Water	Location	Time record held	References / Notes
	Blue orfe (Leuciscus idus coerulus)	6 lb 3 oz	Trevor Cozens	4 April 2010	Angler's Paradise, Beaworthy	Devon	16 years, 227 days	* Note 8
	Blue tench (Tinca coerulus)	3 lb 8 oz	Charlie Rorison-Jones	19 October 2025	Specimen Lake, Angler's Paradise, Beaworthy	Devon	1 year, 29 days	* Note 8
	Carp, F1 (Cyprinus carpio communia) × (Carassius carassius)	7 lb 14 oz	Chris Telling	4 February 2016	Peg 19 Boundary pool, Manor Farm Leisure, Harvington, near Evesham	Worcestershire	10 years, 286 days	* Note 8
	Golden tench (Tinca aurea)	8 lb	John Richardson	26 August 2019	Lake Geneva, Nar Valley Fisheries, Narborough	Norfolk	7 years, 83 days	* Note 8
	Goldfish (Carassius auratus)	7 lb 5 oz	Stuart Thurston	10 August 2010	UEA Broad, University of East Anglia, Norwich	Norfolk	16 years, 99 days	* Note 8
	Ghost koi carp (Cyprinus carpio spiritus)	48lb 4oz	Andrew wilkie	18th September 2026	Syndicate lake Nottinghamshire (exact lake needs to be detailed)	Nottinghamshire	60 days	Reference required (magazine or newspaper article)
	Ghost koi carp (Cyprinus carpio spiritus)	47 lb 14 oz	Joel Dighton	1 August 2017	D lake, Nunnery lakes, Thetford	Norfolk	9 years, 108 days	* Note 8
	Mandarin catfish (Silurus glanis)	64 lb 1 oz	Tony Corbet	5 Sept 2013	Crowsheath Fishery, Downham	Essex	13 years, 73 days	* Note 8
	Trout, blue (Oncorhynchus mykiss coerulus)	19 lb 12 oz	Chris Stephens	1 July 2006	Pennine Trout Farm and Fishery, Littleborough, Rochdale	Lancashire	20 years, 139 days	* Note 8
	Trout, golden (Oncorhynchus mykiss aguabonita)	22 lb 8 oz	David Hillary	6 April 2008	Quarry Lake, Raygill Fishing Lakes, Lothersdale	North Yorkshire	18 years, 225 days	* Note 8
	Trout, sparctic (brook/char) (Sparctic trout Salvelinus fontinalis × Salvelinus alpinus)	11 lb 15 oz	Andy Ford	12 April 2021	Dever Springs fishery Barton Stacey	Hampshire	5 years, 219 days	* Note 8
	Trout, tiger (brown/brook) (Salmo trutta × Salvelinus fontinalis)	11 lb 8 oz	Stevie Rankin	16 December 2011	Alderneuk Trout Fishery, Waterside Farm, Terregles	Dumfries and Galloway, Scotland	14 years, 336 days	* Note 8

== Record non-indigenous (invasive) species ==
Image	Species	Weight (lb oz)	Captor	Date	Water	Location	Time record held	References / Notes
	Asp (Aspius aspius)	10 lb	Sonny Fowler	December 2014	Churchgate Fishery near Battlesbridge	Essex	11 years, 324 days	* Note 8
	Bitterling (Rhodeus amarus)	12 dr	Dennis Flack	1998	Barway Lake near Ely	Cambridgeshire	24 years	* Note 10
	Blue carp (Mylopharyngodon piceus)	36 lb	Bandan Pizzy	October 2019	Specimen lake, Hawkhurst Fishery, Hawkhurst	Kent	7 years, 46 days	* Note 8
	Black bullhead (catfish) (Ameiurus melas)	1 lb 3 oz 1 dr	K Clements	2001	Lake Meadows, Billericay	Essex	21 years	* Note 7 + 10 + 11
	Channel catfish (Ictalurus punctatus)	14 lb	Luke Pike	4 July 2022	Lake Meadows Park, Billericay	Essex	4 years, 136 days	* Note 7 + 8
	Pumpkinseed (Lepomis gibbosus)	14 oz 2 dr	Bill Rushmer	8 July 2003	Tanyards Fishery, Furner's Green	East Sussex	23 years, 132 days	* Note 10
	Silver carp (Hypophthalmichthys molitrix)	30 lb	Chris Johnson	2011	Greaves End Fishery, Eastrington	East Riding of Yorkshire	11 years	* Note 8
	Walleye (Sander vitreus)	11 lb 12 oz	F Adams	1934	River Delph Welney	Norfolk	88 years	* Note 10

== Historical records ==
Image	Species	Weight (lb oz)	Captor	Date	Water	Location	Time record held	References
	Arctic char (Salvelinus alpinus)	8 lb 4 oz	F Nicholson	1992	Loch Arkaig, Inverness	Scottish Highlands, Scotland	3 years	
	Arctic char (Salvelinus alpinus)	4 lb 13 oz	P Savage	1987	Loch Garry	Perthshire, Scotland	5 years	
	Arctic char (Salvelinus alpinus)	3 lb 5 oz	A Robertson	1985	Loch Earn	Perthshire, Scotland	2 years	
	Arctic char (Salvelinus alpinus)	3 lb 4 oz	S.C Rex	1982	Loch Dubh Lochan, Inverness	Inverness-shire, Scotland	3 years	
	Arctic char (Salvelinus alpinus)	1 lb 12 oz 4 dr	C Imperiale	1974	Loch Insh, Badenoch and Strathspey	Scottish Highlands, Scotland	8 years	
	Arctic char (Salvelinus alpinus)	1 lb 11 oz	B.A Richardson	1973	Lake Windermere, Kendal	Cumbria	1 year	
	Arctic char (Salvelinus alpinus)	1 lb 3 oz	P Elwood	1972	Loch Insh, Badenoch and Strathspey	Scottish Highlands, Scotland	1 year	
	Arctic char (Salvelinus alpinus)	1 lb 1 oz 4 dr	J.K Hargreaves	1971	Carn Tarsuinn, Cairngorms	Scottish Highlands, Scotland	1 year	
	Barbel (Barbus barbus)	22 lb 1 oz	Simon Baker	1 December 2025	Kings Weir, River Lea near Turnford and Nazeing	Hertfordshire	3 months	
	Barbel (Barbus barbus)	22 lb 0 oz	James Crosby	30 November 2024	Kings Weir, River Lea near Turnford and Nazeing	Hertfordshire	1 year	
	Barbel (Barbus barbus)	21 lb 2 oz	Colin Smithson	7 November 2019	River Rother, Fittleworth	West Sussex	5 years	
	Barbel (Barbus barbus)	21 lb 1 oz	Grahame King	22 April 2006	Great Ouse, Adam's Mill, Gayhurst	Buckinghamshire	13 years	
	Barbel (Barbus barbus)	21 lb	Grahame King	9 November 2005	Great Ouse, Adam's Mill, Gayhurst	Buckinghamshire	Less than 1 year	
	Barbel (Barbus barbus)	20 lb 14 oz 8 dr	Grahame King	22 October 2005	Great Ouse, Adam's Mill, Gayhurst	Buckinghamshire	18 days	
	Barbel (Barbus barbus)	20 lb 6 oz	Tony Gibson	October 2004	Upper Great Ouse, Kickles Farm, Newport Pagnell	Buckinghamshire	1 year	
	Barbel (Barbus barbus)	19 lb 6 oz 8 dr	Steve Curtin	27 October 2001	Great Ouse, Adam's Mill, Gayhurst	Buckinghamshire	3 years	
	Barbel (Barbus barbus)	19 lb	Tony Gibson	4 January 2001	Upper Great Ouse, Kickles Farm, Newport Pagnell	Buckinghamshire	Less than 1 year	
	Barbel (Barbus barbus)	17 lb 13 oz 14 dr	Stuart Morgan	20 December 2000	Great Ouse, Adam's Mill, Gayhurst	Buckinghamshire	15 days	
	Barbel (Barbus barbus)	17 lb 8 oz 15 dr	Stuart Morgan	11 December 2000	Great Ouse, Adam's Mill, Gayhurst	Buckinghamshire	9 days	
	Barbel (Barbus barbus)	17 lb 6 oz 12 dr	Guy Robb	October 2000	Great Ouse, Adam's Mill, Gayhurst	Buckinghamshire	Less than 1 year	
	Barbel (Barbus barbus)	17 lb 4 oz	Ray Walton	3 March 1999	Great Ouse, Adam's Mill, Gayhurst	Buckinghamshire	1 year	
	Barbel (Barbus barbus)	17 lb 1 oz	Kevin Newton	5 February 1999	Great Ouse, Adam's Mill, Gayhurst	Buckinghamshire	26 days	
	Barbel (Barbus barbus)	16 lb 11 oz	Martin Bowler	21 January 1999	Great Ouse, Adam's Mill, Gayhurst	Buckinghamshire	15 days	
	Barbel (Barbus barbus)	16 lb 10 oz	David Currell	3 November 1998	Great Ouse, Adam's Mill, Gayhurst	Buckinghamshire	3 months	
	Barbel (Barbus barbus)	16 lb 6 oz	Steve Keer	August 1998	River Wensum, Taverham Mills Fishery, Taverham	Norfolk	3 months	
	Barbel (Barbus barbus)	16 lb 3 oz	Howard Maddox	November 1997	Lower river, River Severn, Worcester	Worcestershire	Less than 1 year	
	Barbel (Barbus barbus)	16 lb 2 oz	Peter Woodhouse	June 1994	River Medway	Kent	3 years	
	Barbel (Barbus barbus)	13 lb 12 oz	Joe Day	October 1962	Royalty Fishery, Hampshire Avon, Christchurch	Dorset	32 years	
	Barbel (Barbus barbus)	14 lb 6 oz *(equalled)	Mr F.W.K Wallis	1937	Royalty, Hampshire Avon, Christchurch	Dorset	25 years	Note 2 *
	Barbel (Barbus barbus)	14 lb 6 oz *(equalled)	Aylmer Tryon	13 September 1934	Royalty, Hampshire Avon, Christchurch	Dorset	60 years	Note 2 *
	Barbel (Barbus barbus)	14 lb 6 oz *	Mr T Wheeler	1888	River Thames, Molesey Lock	Surrey	46 years	Note 2 *
	Bleak (Alburnus alburnus)	4 oz	B Derrington	8 October 1982	River Monnow, Monmouth	Monmouthshire, Wales	16 years	
	Bleak (Alburnus alburnus)	3 oz 15.5 dr	D Pollard	1971	Staythorpe Pond, Newark-on-Trent	Nottinghamshire	11 years	
	Bleak (Alburnus alburnus)	3 oz 8 dr	N D Sizmur	1963	River Thames, Walton-on-Thames	Surrey	8 years	
	Bleak (Alburnus alburnus)	3 oz 4 dr	J Oliver	1958	River Thames, Kingston upon Thames	London	5 years	
	Bream (common or bronze) (Abramis brama)	20 lb 1 oz	Simon Lavin	2011	Stoneacres Lake	Oxfordshire	1 year	
	Bream (common or bronze) (Abramis brama)	22 lb 9 oz	Mark McKenna	11 Sept 2009	Ferry Lagoon, Fen Drayton Lakes	Cambridgeshire	3 years	* Note 8
	Bream (common or bronze) (Abramis brama)	19 lb 10 oz	James Rust	2005	Ferry Lagoon, Fen Drayton Lakes	Cambridgeshire	4 years	
	Bream (common or bronze) (Abramis brama)	18 lb 15 oz 3 dr	Mark Neal	1 May 2004	Bawburgh Lakes, Norwich	Norfolk	1 year	
	Bream (common or bronze) (Abramis brama)	18 lb 15 oz	Tom Huntley	July 2001	Bawburgh Lakes, Norwich	Norfolk	3 years	
	Bream (common or bronze) (Abramis brama)	18 lb 8 oz	Kerry Walker	13 May 2001	Bawburgh Lakes, Norwich	Norfolk	Less than 1 year	
	Bream (common or bronze) (Abramis brama)	16 lb 12 oz	Martin Whitmore	2000	Swithland Reservoir	Leicestershire	1 year	
	Bream (common or bronze) (Abramis brama)	16 lb 10 oz	Lee McManus	1999	Swithland Reservoir	Leicestershire	1 year	
	Bream (common or bronze) (Abramis brama)	15 lb 10 oz	J Knowles	1985	Queensford Lagoon, Dorchester on Thames	Oxfordshire	14 years	
	Bream (common or bronze) (Abramis brama)	15 lb 6 oz	Alastair Nicholson	31 August 1984	Queensford Lagoon, Dorchester on Thames	Oxfordshire	1 year	* Note 8
	Bream (common or bronze) (Abramis brama)	13 lb 14 oz	Alastair Nicholson	10 August 1984	Queensford Lagoon, Dorchester on Thames	Oxfordshire	Less than 1 year	* Note 8
	Bream (common or bronze) (Abramis brama)	13 lb 9 oz	Michael Davidson	July 1982	Beeston Hall Lake, near Neatishead	Norfolk	2 years	
	Bream (common or bronze) (Abramis brama)	13 lb 8 oz	E.G.Costin	October 1945	Castle Lakes, Chiddingstone	Kent	37 years	
	Bream (common or bronze) (Abramis brama)	12 lb 14 oz	Mr. C.J Pugh	28 July 1933	Tring Reservoirs, Tring	Hertfordshire	12 years	
	Bream (common or bronze) (Abramis brama)	12 lb 12 oz 8 dr	Mr. A.J Fisher	30 July 1931	Startops End Reservoir, Tring Reservoirs, Tring	Hertfordshire	2 years	
	Bream (common or bronze) (Abramis brama)	11 lb 12 oz	Mr. A Pike	July 1882	River Blackwater	County Tyrone, Northern Ireland	49 years	
	Bream (silver) (Blicca bjoerkna)	3 lb 1 oz	Matthew Faulkner	12 May 2012	Mill Farm Fishery, Bury, near Pulborough	West Sussex	Less than 1 year	
	Bream (silver) (Blicca bjoerkna)	2 lb 15 oz	Gary Barnett	9 October 2011	Mill Farm Fishery, Bury	West Sussex	Less than 1 year	
	Bream (silver) (Blicca bjoerkna)	2 lb 14 oz	Phil Morton	8 May 2009	Mill Farm Fishery, Bury	West Sussex	2 years	
	Bream (silver) (Blicca bjoerkna)	2 lb 11 oz	Doug Plant	2009	Mill Farm Fishery, Bury	West Sussex	Less than 1 year	
	Bream (silver) (Blicca bjoerkna)	2 lb 8 oz	James Waters	December 2008	Mill Farm Fishery, Bury	West Sussex	1 year	* Note 8
	Bream (silver) (Blicca bjoerkna)	2 lb 2 oz	Christine Smith	2005	Mill Farm Fishery, Bury	West Sussex	3 years	
	Bream (silver) (Blicca bjoerkna)	1 lb 12 oz	Michael Davidson	26 April 2003	Mill Farm Fishery, Bury	West Sussex	2 years	
	Bream (silver) (Blicca bjoerkna)	15 oz	Dennis Flack	1998	Grime Spring, Lakenheath	Suffolk	5 years	
	Bullhead (millers thumb) (Cottus gobio)	12 dr	E Whalley	1981	Tanyard Beck / Daking Brook / Cawthorne Dike, Cawthorne	South Yorkshire	2 years	
	Bullhead (millers thumb) (Cottus gobio)	10 dr	E Harrison	1978	Leeds and Liverpool Canal	North Yorkshire, Lancashire, Merseyside	3 years	
	Burbot (Lota lota) in UK only - see Note 3.	15 oz	Peter Davis	1960	Little Ouse, Lakenheath	Suffolk	9 years	* Note 8
	Carp (Cyprinus carpio)	71 lb 4 oz	Robby Harrison	23 October 2016	The Avenue, RH Fisheries	Shropshire	4 years	* Note 8
	Carp (Cyprinus carpio)	69 lb 13 oz	Tom Doherty	26 Sept 2016	The Avenue, RH Fisheries	Shropshire	Less than 1 month	* Note 8
	Carp (Cyprinus carpio)	68 lb 1 oz	Dean Fletcher	13 January 2016	Cranwells Lake, Wasing estate, Wasing	Berkshire	Less than 1 year	
	Carp (Cyprinus carpio)	67 lb 8 oz	Austin Holness	August 2008	Conningbrook Lake, Willesborough	Kent	8 years	
	Carp (Cyprinus carpio)	67 lb	John Bird	13 April 2008	Conningbrook Lake, Willesborough	Kent	less than 1 year	
	Carp (Cyprinus carpio)	65 lb 14 oz	Simon Bater	23 October 2005	Conningbrook Lake, Willesborough	Kent	3 years	
	Carp (Cyprinus carpio)	65 lb 8 oz	Dan Marwick	Sept 2005	Conningbrook Lake, Willesborough	Kent	Less than 1 year	
	Carp (Cyprinus carpio)	64 lb 5 oz	Jonathan Pack	21 February 2004	Conningbrook Lake, Willesborough	Kent	1 year	
	Carp (Cyprinus carpio)	61 lb 7 oz	Lee Jackson	29 August 2002	Conningbrook Lake, Willesborough	Kent	2 years	
	Carp (Cyprinus carpio)	61 lb	Gary Bayes	2001	Conningbrook Lake, Willesborough	Kent	Less than 1 year	
	Carp (Cyprinus carpio)	59 lb 12 oz	Mark Toland	5 Sept 2001	Conningbrook Lake, Willesborough	Kent	Less than 1 year	
	Carp (Cyprinus carpio)	59 lb 7 oz	Terry Glebioska	2 April 2001	Conningbrook Lake, Willesborough	Kent	Less than 1 year	
	Carp (Cyprinus carpio)	56 lb 6 oz	Kevin Cummins	Sept 1998	Wraysbury	Berkshire	3 years	
	Carp (Cyprinus carpio)	55 lb 13 oz	Terry Hearn	November 1996	Wraysbury	Berkshire	2 years	
	Carp (Cyprinus carpio)	55 lb 4 oz	Alex White	June 1995	Mid-Northants Fishery	Northamptonshire	1 year	
	Carp (Cyprinus carpio)	53 lb 15 oz	Roddy Porter	June 1995	Mid-Northants Fishery	Northamptonshire	3 weeks	* Note 8
	Carp (Cyprinus carpio)	51 lb 8 oz	Chris Yates	16 June 1980	Redmire pool	Herefordshire	16 Years	* Note 8
	Carp (Cyprinus carpio)	44 lb	Richard Walker	13 Sept 1952	Redmire pool	Herefordshire	28 Years	
	Carp (Cyprinus carpio)	31 lb 8 oz	Bob Richards	3 October 1951	Redmire pool	Herefordshire	1 Year	
	Carp (Cyprinus carpio)	26 lb	Albert Buckley	24 July 1930	Mapperley Lake, Shipley Hall, near Mapperley	border of Derbyshire and Nottinghamshire	4 Years	
	Carp (Cyprinus carpio)	21 lb 10 oz	Mr A.E.Wyatt	14 August 1926	Chingford Lake, Chingford	Essex	4 years	
	Carp (Cyprinus carpio)	20 lb 3 oz	John Andrews	9 September 1916	Cheshunt reservoir	Hertfordshire	10 years	
	Carp (Cyprinus carpio)	19 lb 8 oz	Mr H.S Locksmith	1907	Wey Navigation Canal, Weybridge	Surrey	9 years	
	Carp (Cyprinus carpio)	17 lb 8 oz	Otto Overbeck	26 September 1902	Croxby Pond	Lincolnshire	5 years	
	Carp (Cyprinus carpio)	23 lb	George Holden	1899	Broadwater Lake, Godalming	Surrey	31 years	Note - Under further investigation
	Carp, common (Cyprinus carpio {communia})	68 lb	George Benos	26 February 2026	Burghfield Main Lake	Berkshire	2 months	* Note 8
	Carp, common (Cyprinus carpio {communia})	64 lb 6 oz	Chris Caddick	29 August 2018	The Avenue, RH Fisheries	Shropshire	8 years	* Note 8
	Carp, common (Cyprinus carpio {communia})	64 lb	Martin Hopkins	2005	Bluebells Lake, Tansor, near Oundle	Northamptonshire	13 years	* Note 8
	Carp, common (Cyprinus carpio {communia})	64 lb	Mike O'Neill * (equalled)	13 October 2017	The Avenue, RH Fisheries	Shropshire	1 year	* Note 8
	Chub (Squalius cephalus)	8 lb 14 oz	Gareth Spurgeon	15 October 2009	River Lea Relief Channel, Fishers Green	Hertfordshire	3 years	* Note 8
	Chub (Squalius cephalus)	8 lb 13 oz	Tim Archer	11 March 2003	Dobbs Weir Fishery, River Lea, Broxbourne	Hertfordshire	6 years	
	Chub (Squalius cephalus)	8 lb 10 oz	Peter Smith	1994	River Tees, Blackwell	Co.Durham	9 years	
	Chub (Squalius cephalus)	8 lb 8 oz	D Deeks	1951	River Rother (East Sussex)	East Sussex	43 years	
	Chub (Squalius cephalus)	8 lb 4 oz	Mr G.F. Smith	December 1913	Royalty Fishery, Hampshire Avon, Christchurch	Dorset	38 years	* Note 8
	Chub (Squalius cephalus)	7 lb 6 oz 8 dr	Mr F.W. Smith	October 1906	Royalty Fishery, Hampshire Avon, Christchurch	Dorset	7 years	
	Chub (Squalius cephalus)	7 lb 5 oz	Mr E.J Walker	17 August 1904	Royalty Fishery, Hampshire Avon, Christchurch	Dorset	2 years	
	Chub (Squalius cephalus)	7 lb 2 oz	Mr F.W.K Wallis	1903	River Trent, Shardlow	Derbyshire	1 year	
	Chub (Squalius cephalus)	7 lb 1 oz	Stanley Mead	Sept 1897	River Thames, Wargrave	Berkshire	6 years	
	Chub (Squalius cephalus)	4 lb 5 oz	B.S. Tomans	15 Oct 1896	River Bure	Norfolk	1 year	
	Carp, leather (Cyprinus carpio {corium})	54 lb 8 oz	Steve Fudge	2006	Car Park Lake, Yateley Complex, Yateley	Surrey	16 years	* Note 8
	Crucian carp (Carassius carassius)	4 lb 14 oz	Adam Broodbanks	30 October 2024	Barham Syndicate Lake	Suffolk	18 months	
	Crucian carp (Carassius carassius)	4 lb 12 oz	Julian Barnes	3 May 2021	Johnsons Lake, Milford, Godalming	Surrey	3 years & 5 months	
	Crucian carp (Carassius carassius)	4 lb 11 oz	Craig Smithson	3 August 2020	Milton Abbas Fishery, Milton Abbas	Dorset	10 months	
	Crucian carp (Carassius carassius)	4 lb 10 oz	Michael James	4 May 2015	Johnsons Lake, Milford, Godalming	Surrey	5 years	
	Crucian carp (Carassius carassius)	4 lb 10 oz	Stephen Frapwell	10 May 2015	Johnsons Lake, Milford, Godalming	Surrey	5 years	
	Crucian carp (Carassius carassius)	4 lb 9 oz	Peter Cardozo	2 May 2015	Johnsons Lake, Milford, Godalming	Surrey	2 days	
	Crucian carp (Carassius carassius)	4 lb 9 oz	Joshua Blavins	17 August 2011	Moor Mill Gravel Pits, Frogmore	Hertfordshire	4 years	
	Crucian carp (Carassius carassius)	4 lb 9 oz	Philip Smith	7 August 2004	RMC Summer pit, Yateley	Surrey	7 years	
	Crucian carp (Carassius carassius)	4 lb 9 oz	Martin Bowler	16 May 2003	Little Moulsham Lake, Yateley	Surrey	8 years	
	Crucian carp (Carassius carassius)	4 lb 8 oz	Jay Allen	2000	RMC Summer pit, Yateley	Surrey	4 years	
	Crucian carp (Carassius carassius)	4 lb 11 oz	Mr. H.C.Hinson	25 September 1938	Broadwater Lake, Godalming	Surrey	62 years	Note 2 *
	Dace (Leuciscus leuciscus)	1 lb 4 oz 2 dr	Jack L Gasson	1960	Little Ouse near Thetford	Norfolk	42 years	
	Dace (Leuciscus leuciscus)	1 lb 8 oz 5 dr *	R.W.Humphrey	1932	Hampshire Avon	Dorset	28 years	Note 2 *
	Dace (Leuciscus leuciscus)	1 lb 6 oz 8 dr	S.Corley	1910	River Gade, Watford	Hertfordshire	22 years	
	Dace (Leuciscus leuciscus)	1 lb 6 oz (equalled)	Mr. Hullet	1907	Millstream, Sopley, Christchurch	Dorset	3 years	
	Dace (Leuciscus leuciscus)	1 lb 6 oz	R.Robinson	1905	River Beane, Hertford	Hertfordshire	5 years	
	Dace (Leuciscus leuciscus)	1 lb 4 oz	A.R.Matthews	1899	River Beane	Hertfordshire	6 years	
	Dace (Leuciscus leuciscus)	1 lb 3 oz 8 dr	E. Steinhart	1889	River Beane	Hertfordshire	10 years	
	Eel (Anguilla anguilla) Note 3.	11 lb 2 oz	Steve Terry	24 June 1978	Kingfisher Lake, Ringwood	Hampshire	46 years	
	Eel (Anguilla anguilla) Note 3.	8 lb 10 oz	Alan Dart	1969	Hunstrete Lake, Hunstrete	Somerset	9 years	
	Eel (Anguilla anguilla) Note 3.	8 lb 8 oz	Mr Ward	1948	Fritton Decoy, Great Yarmouth	Norfolk	21 years (shared)	
	Eel (Anguilla anguilla) Note 3.	8 lb 8 oz	C Mitchell	1922	Bitterwell Lake, Coalpit Heath, Bristol	Somerset	47 years	
	Ghost koi carp (Cyprinus carpio spiritus)	47 lb 12 oz	Steve Lockwood	1 October 2014	D lake, Nunnery lakes, Thetford	Norfolk	3 years	* Note 8
	Ghost koi carp (Cyprinus carpio spiritus)	45 lb 8 oz	Richard Freeman	2006	River Trent	Nottinghamshire	8 years	* Note 8
	Grass carp (Ctenopharyngodon idella)	56 lb 2 oz	Alan Cooper	7 July 2023	Little Moulsham Lake, Yateley	Surrey	2 years	* Note 8
	Grass carp (Ctenopharyngodon idella)	53 lb 12 oz	David Beagley	23 August 2018	Little Moulsham Lake, Yateley	Surrey	5 years	* Note 8
	Grass carp (Ctenopharyngodon idella)	52 lb 10 oz	Martin Bowler	2 July 2016	Little Moulsham Lake, Yateley	Surrey	2 years	* Note 8
	Grass carp (Ctenopharyngodon idella)	52 lb 8 oz	Eddie Lancaster	3 August 2012	Horton Church Lake, Horton	Berkshire	4 years	* Note 8
	Grass carp (Ctenopharyngodon idella)	46 lb	Ollie Gurr	3 August 2011	Horton Church Lake, Horton	Berkshire	1 year	* Note 8
	Grass carp (Ctenopharyngodon idella)	44 lb 8 oz	Philip Kingsbury	2006	Horton Church Lake, Horton	Berkshire	5 years	
	Grass carp (Ctenopharyngodon idella)	39 lb 2 oz	Kevin Ballard	19 June 2002	Horton Church Lake, Horton	Berkshire	4 years	
	Grass carp (Ctenopharyngodon idella)	36 lb 8 oz	Colin Nash	10 June 2001	Horton Church Lake, Horton	Berkshire	1 year	
	Grass carp (Ctenopharyngodon idella)	33 lb 12 oz	Simon Lavin	1999	Horton Church Lake, Horton	Berkshire	2 years	
	Grass carp (Ctenopharyngodon idella)	31 lb	Del Smith	1997	Horton Church Lake, Horton	Berkshire	2 years	
	Grass carp (Ctenopharyngodon idella)	28 lb 12 oz 8 dr	S Dolman	1995	Horton Church Lake, Horton	Berkshire	2 years	
	Grass carp (Ctenopharyngodon idella)	25 lb 4 oz	D Buck	1993	Honeycroft fisheries Tonbridge	Kent	2 years	
	Grass carp (Ctenopharyngodon idella)	9 lb 12 oz	G.W Gwilt	1983	Llyn Trawsfynydd, Trawsfynydd	Gwynedd, Wales	10 years	
	Grayling (Thymallus thymallus)	4 lb 4 oz 8 dr	Paul Mildren	2009	River Frome, Dorchester	Dorset	10 years	
	Grayling (Thymallus thymallus)	4 lb 3 oz *(equalled)	M Loughton	1993	River Frome	Dorset	16 years	
	Grayling (Thymallus thymallus)	4 lb 3 oz	S. R. Lanigan	1989	River Frome	Dorset	20 years	
	Grayling (Thymallus thymallus)	3 lb 12 oz	M.T Hooper	1988	River Frome, Loudsmill, Dorchester	Dorset	1 year	
	Grayling (Thymallus thymallus)	3 lb 10 oz	I White	1983	River Allen (Dorset), Wimborne Minster	Dorset	5 years	
	Grayling (Thymallus thymallus)	2 lb 13 oz	P.B Goldsmith	1981	River Test, Romsey	Hampshire	2 years	
	Grayling (Thymallus thymallus)	2 lb 12 oz	B Wade	14 January 1936	Throop Fishery, River Stour	Dorset	45 years	
	Gudgeon (Gobio gobio)	4 oz 4 dr	M Bowen	1977	Ebbe Vale Pond, Ebbw Vale	Blaenau Gwent, Wales	13 years	
	Gudgeon (Gobio gobio)	4 oz	M Morris	1971	Susworth Roach Ponds Susworth	Lincolnshire	6 years	
	Gudgeon (Gobio gobio)	4 oz 4 dr *(equalled)	J.D Lewtin	1950	River Soar	Leicestershire	21 years	Note 2 *
	Gudgeon (Gobio gobio)	4 oz 4 dr * (equalled)	W.R Bostock	1935	Hoggs Pond, Shipley	Derbyshire	36 years	Note 2 *
	Gudgeon (Gobio gobio)	4 oz 4 dr *	G. Cedrick	1933	River Thames, Datchet	Berkshire	38 years	Note 2 *
	Gudgeon (Gobio gobio)	2 oz 8 dr	F. Parker	27 Oct 1923	River Tees, Middleton One Row, Borough of Darlington	County Durham	10 years	
	Ide (natural) (Leuciscus idus)	7 lb 6 oz	Ian Green	4 August 2017	River Trent	Nottinghamshire	4 years	* Note 8
	Ide (natural) (Leuciscus idus)	6 lb 10 oz	Colin Hebb	11 July 2017	River Hull	Yorkshire	Less than one month	* Note 8
	Ide (natural) (Leuciscus idus)	6 lb 3 oz	Colin Hebb	1 March 2016	River Hull	Yorkshire	1 year	* Note 8
	Mullet (thin-lipped grey) (Liza ramada)	7 lb 0 oz 3 dr	Steve Maliska	22 May 2012	Truro River, Malpas	Cornwall	Less than 1 year	
	Mullet (thin-lipped grey) (Liza ramada)	7 lb	N Mableson	1991	Oulton Broad, Lowestoft	Suffolk	21 years	
	Mullet (thin-lipped grey) (Liza ramada)	6 lb 4 oz	H Mepham	1981	River Rother (East Sussex)	East Sussex	10 years	
	Mullet (thin-lipped grey) (Liza ramada)	5 lb 11 oz	D Knowles	1975	River Rother (East Sussex)	East Sussex	6 years	
	Minnow (Phoxinus phoxinus)	13 dr (23 grams)	R Merrifield	1981	River Calder (Lancashire)	Lancashire	17 years	
	Minnow (Phoxinus phoxinus)	11 dr (19.5 grams)	I.S Colinge	1979	River Calder (Lancashire)	Lancashire	2 years	
	Minnow (Phoxinus phoxinus)	9 dr (16 grams)	R Guy	1978	River Rother (West Sussex), Midhurst	West Sussex	1 year	
	Orfe / ide (Leuciscus idus)	8 lb 4 oz	Norman Agnew	April 2000	Lymm vale	Cheshire	Less than 1 year	* Note 8
	Orfe / ide (Leuciscus idus)	8 lb 1 oz	Kev Shore	March 2000	Lymm vale	Cheshire	Less than 1 year	* Note 8
	Orfe / ide (Leuciscus idus)	7 lb 14 oz 8 dr	Mick Pardoe	1998	Lymm vale	Cheshire	2 years	
	Orfe / ide (Leuciscus idus)	7 lb 7 oz	D Smith	1995	Horton Pool, Horton	Berkshire	3 years	
	Orfe / ide (Leuciscus idus)	4 lb 12 oz	J Moran	1986	Burton Towers, Rossett, Wrexham	Denbighshire, Clwyd, Wales	9 years	
	Orfe / ide (Leuciscus idus)	4 lb 3 oz 8 dr	D.R Charles	1983	River Kennet	Berkshire	3 years	
	Orfe / ide (Leuciscus idus)	4 lb 3 oz	Brian Mills	1976	River Test	Hampshire	7 years	
	Orfe / ide (Leuciscus idus)	3 lb 14 oz 8 dr	D Stephens	1973	Winford Brook, Chew Magna	Somerset	3 years	
	Orfe / ide (Leuciscus idus)	3 lb 2 oz 7 dr	Bill Penny	21 July 1937	Virginia Water Lake, Windsor Great Park, Borough of Runnymede	Surrey	36 years	
	Perch (Perca fluviatilis)	5 lb 15 oz	Les Brown	17 February 2006	Stream Valley Lakes, Crowborough	East Sussex	5 years	
	Perch (Perca fluviatilis)	5 lb 9 oz 8 dr	Dean Rawlings	28 March 2002	Glebe Lakes, Fringford	Oxfordshire	4 years	
	Perch (Perca fluviatilis)	5 lb 9 oz	John Shayler	6 March 1985	Furnace Pond, Horsmonden	Kent	17 years	
	Perch (Perca fluviatilis)	4 lb 14 oz 12 dr	Mrs Ethel Owen	1984	Kings Lake, Romsey	Hampshire	1 year	
	Perch (Perca fluviatilis)	4 lb 12 oz	Sid Baker	1962	Oulton Broad, Lowestoft	Suffolk	22 years	
	Perch (Perca fluviatilis)	4 lb 2 oz 8 dr	G Butler	14 November 1932	Hobhole Drain, Witham Navigable Drains	Lincolnshire	30 years	
	Pike (Esox lucius)	46 lb 13 oz	Roy Lewis	October 1992	Llandegfedd Reservoir, Llandegveth	Monmouthshire, Wales	32 years	
	Pike (Esox lucius)	45 lb 6 oz	Gareth Edwards	March 1990	Llandegfedd Reservoir, Llandegveth	Monmouthshire, Wales	2 years	
	Pike (Esox lucius)	44 lb 14 oz	M.Linton	4 January 1987	Ardleigh Reservoir, Ardleigh near Colchester	Essex	3 years	
	Pike (Esox lucius)	42 lb 2 oz	Derek Amies	August 1985	River Thurne, near Potter Heigham	Norfolk	2 years	
	Pike (Esox lucius)	41 lb 6 oz	N.Fickling	February 1985	River Thurne, near Potter Heigham	Norfolk	Less than 1 year	
	Pike (Esox lucius)	40 lb 4 oz	K.Vogel	1972	Loch Ken	Dumfries and Galloway, Scotland	15 years	
	Pike (Esox lucius)	40 lb	P.Hancock	February 1967	Horsey Mere, Horsey	Norfolk	5 years	
	Pike (Esox lucius)	47 lb 11 oz *	Tommy Morgan	July 1945	Loch Lomond	Dunbartonshire, Scotland	22 years	Note 2 *
	Pike (Esox lucius)	39 lb 7 oz	G.F Parrott	March 1909	Dorset Stour	Dorset	58 years	
	Pike (Esox lucius)	37 lb	Alex Jardine	1879	Shardeloes Lake, Amersham	Buckinghamshire	30 years	
	Pike (Esox lucius)	36 lb	G.Forbes	1875	Luton Hoo, Luton	Bedfordshire	4 years (joint)	
	Pike (Esox lucius)	36 lb	G.Keen	March 1874	Rapley Lake, Bagshot	Berkshire	5 years	
	Pike (Esox lucius)	16 lb 2 oz	Mr Murphy	20 Jan 1873	River Thames Richmond	Surrey	1 year	
	Powan (Coregonus clupeoides) Note 3	1 lb 7 oz	J.M Ryder	1972	Loch Lomond	Dunbartonshire, Scotland	34 years	
	Powan (Coregonus clupeoides) Note 3	1 lb 5 oz 12 dr	D.J Warren	1970	Loch Lomond	Dunbartonshire, Scotland	2 years	
	Powan (Coregonus clupeoides) Note 3	11 oz 12 dr	F. Buller	1968	Loch Lomond	Dunbartonshire, Scotland	2 years	
	Pumpkinseed (Lepomis gibbosus)	5 oz	Duncan Charman	21 May 2003	Sway Lakes, Sway	Hampshire	Less than 1 year	
	Pumpkinseed (Lepomis gibbosus)	4 oz 9 dr	Daniel L Wallace	28 June 1987	Whessoe Pond, Darlington	Co.Durham	16 years	
	Pumpkinseed (Lepomis gibbosus)	2 oz 10 dr	A Baverstock	1977	GLC Highgate pond, Hampstead Heath	London	10 years	
	Roach (Rutilus rutilus)	4 lb 3 oz	Ray Clarke	27 October 1990	Dorset Stour, Corfe Mullen	Dorset	16 years	
	Roach (Rutilus rutilus)	4 lb 1 oz	R G Jones	16 June 1975	Colwick Country Park, Colwick	Nottinghamshire	15 years	
	Roach (Rutilus rutilus)	3 lb 13 oz	Bill Penny	6 September 1938	Lambeth reservoir, Molesey	Surrey	37 years	
	Roach (Rutilus rutilus)	3 lb 10 oz	Wilfred Cutting	5 August 1917	Hornsea Mere, Beverley	East Yorkshire	21 years	
	Rudd (Scardinius erythrophthalmus)	4 lb 10 oz	D Webb	28 Sept 1986	Pitsford Reservoir, Pitsford	Northamptonshire	15 years	
	Rudd (Scardinius erythrophthalmus)	4 lb 8 oz	Reverend Edward C Alston	1933	Ring Mere, Wretham near Thetford	Norfolk	53 years	
	Rudd (Scardinius erythrophthalmus)	2 lb 6 oz	R. Belfield	8 Aug 1932	Great Ouse	Buckinghamshire	1 year	
	Ruffe (pope) (Gymnocephalus cernua)	5 oz	P Barrowcliffe	1977	River Bure	Norfolk	3 years	
	Ruffe (pope) (Gymnocephalus cernua)	4 oz	B.B Poynor	1969	River Stour	Warwickshire	8 years	
	Ruffe (pope) (Gymnocephalus cernua)	3 oz 9 dr	A Cartwright	1963	River Mease	Border of Leicestershire and Staffordshire	6 years	
	Salmon, Atlantic (Salmo salar)	61 lb 8 oz	Mr T Stewart	October 1907	River Tay	Perthshire, Scotland	15 years	
	Salmon, Atlantic (Salmo salar)	61 lb	Mr J Haggart	1870	River Tay	Perthshire, Scotland	37 years	
	European sturgeon (Acipenser sturio) Note 3.	66 lb	Lewis Gibson	May 1867	River Thames, Putney	London	65 years	
	Schelly (skelly) (Coregonus stigmaticus) Note 3	1 lb 10 oz	W Wainwright	1976	Ullswater	Cumbria	10 years	
	Schelly (skelly) (Coregonus stigmaticus) Note 3	1 lb 7 oz 8 dr	Geoff Byrne	1973	Ullswater	Cumbria	3 years	
	Schelly (skelly) (Coregonus stigmaticus) Note 3	1 lb 5 oz 10 dr	S.A Smith	1972	Ullswater	Cumbria	1 year	
	Schelly (skelly) (Coregonus stigmaticus) Note 3	1 lb 1 oz	P.F White	1969	River Eden	Cumberland	3 years	
	Stickleback (3-spined) (Gasterosteus aculeatus)	4 dr (7 grams)	Dennis Flack	1998	High Flyer Lake, Ely	Cambridgeshire	20 years	* Note 10
	Stickleback (3-spined) (Gasterosteus aculeatus)	3 dr	M. Drinkwater	1995	River Calder, Brighouse	West Yorkshire	3 years	
	Tench (Tinca tinca)	14 lb 7 oz	Gordon Beavan	Sept 1993	Bury Lake, Rickmansworth	Hertfordshire	8 years	
	Tench (Tinca tinca)	14 lb 3 oz	Phil Gooriah	20 August 1987	Wraysbury 1 Lake, Wraysbury	Berkshire	6 years	
	Tench (Tinca tinca)	12 lb 8 oz 11 dr	Alan Wilson	1985	Wilstone Reservoir, Tring Reservoirs	Hertfordshire	2 years	
	Tench (Tinca tinca)	10 lb 1 oz 4 dr	Tony Chester	1981	Wilstone Reservoir, Tring Reservoirs	Hertfordshire	4 years	
	Tench (Tinca tinca)	10 lb 1 oz 2 dr	Lewis Brown	1975	Peterborough brick pits	Cambridgeshire	6 years	
	Tench (Tinca tinca)	9 lb 1 oz	John Salisbury	1963	Eggetts Lake, Hemingford Grey	Cambridgeshire	12 years	
	Tench (Tinca tinca)	8 lb 8 oz	Maurice Foode	1950	Leicester Line of the Grand Union Canal	Leicestershire	13 years	
	Tench (Tinca tinca)	7 lb (equalled)	Reverend Edward C Alston	July 1933	Ring Mere, Wretham near Thetford	Norfolk	13 years	
	Tench (Tinca tinca)	7 lb	Mr Stacey	1882	Pottery Pits, Weston-super-Mare	Somerset	68 years	
	Trout, brook (Salvelinus fontinalis)	6 lb	D Caisley	1996	Fontburn Reservoir	Northumberland	2 years	
	Trout, brook (Salvelinus fontinalis)	5 lb 13 oz 8 dr	Alan Pearson	13 August 1981	Avington Trout Fishery, Avington	Hampshire	Less than a year	
	Trout, brook (Salvelinus fontinalis)	5 lb 6 oz	Alan Pearson	1979	Avington Trout Fishery, Avington	Hampshire	2 years	
	Trout, brook (Salvelinus fontinalis)	4 lb 15 oz	Stephen Bedford	18 June 1923	Blagdon Lake, Blagdon, Chew Valley,	Somerset	56 years	* Note 8
	Trout, brown (Salmo trutta)	30 lb 8 oz	Ken Oliver	20 July 2000	Loch Awe, Ardbrecknish	Argyll, Scotland	2 years	
	Trout, brown (Salmo trutta)	25 lb 5 oz 12 dr	Andrew Finlay	1996	Loch Awe, Ardbrecknish	Argyll, Scotland	4 years	
	Trout, brown (Salmo trutta)	19 lb 9 oz 4 dr	J.A.F Jackson	1978	Loch Quoish, Inverness-shire	Scottish Highlands, Scotland	18 years	
	Trout, brown (Salmo trutta)	19 lb 4 oz 8 dr	Tommy Chartres	1974	Lower Lough Erne, Enniskillen	Fermanagh, Northern Ireland	4 years	
	Trout, brown (Salmo trutta)	18 lb 2 oz	K.J Grant	1965	Loch Garry, Fort William	Perthshire, Scotland	9 years	
	Trout, brown (Salmo trutta)	12 lb 12 oz	Reverend S.E.V Filleul	11 Sept 1907	River Frome, Dorchester	Dorset	58 years	
	Trout, brown (Salmo trutta)	7 lb 4 oz	W. Knight	5 May 1900	River Thames, Caversham Lock Caversham	Berkshire	7 years	
	Trout, rainbow (Onchorhynchus mykiss)	33 lb 4 oz	J Lawson	2003	Watercress Trout Fishery, Chudleigh	Devon	13 years	
	Trout, rainbow (Onchorhynchus mykiss)	30 lb 12 oz	Tony Flower	July 1994	Osprey lake, Tavistock Trout Fishery, Tavistock	Devon	9 years	
	Trout, rainbow (Onchorhynchus mykiss)	28 lb	Alan Higgins	October 1992	The Mill Pool at Duncton Trout Fishery, Duncton	West Sussex	2 years	
	Trout, rainbow (Onchorhynchus mykiss)	24 lb 2 oz 13 dr	J Moore	1990	Pennine Trout Fishery, Littleborough	Lancashire	2 years	
	Trout, rainbow (Onchorhynchus mykiss)	21 lb 4 oz 4 dr	D Graham	Oct 1986	Loch Awe	Argyll, Scotland	4 years	
	Trout, rainbow (Onchorhynchus mykiss)	20 lb 7 oz	Peter Cockwill	16 Sept 1986	Avington Trout Fishery, Avington	Hampshire	less than 1 month	
	Trout, rainbow (Onchorhynchus mykiss)	19 lb 8 oz	Alan Pearson	1977	Avington Trout Fishery, Avington	Hampshire	9 years	
	Trout, rainbow (Onchorhynchus mykiss)	19 lb 2 oz	Roy Hopkins	April 1977	Avington Trout Fishery, Avington	Hampshire	Less than 1 year	
	Trout, rainbow (Onchorhynchus mykiss)	18 lb 7 oz	Alan Pearson	April 1977	Avington Trout Fishery, Avington	Hampshire	Less than 1 year	
	Trout, rainbow (Onchorhynchus mykiss)	18 lb	Alan Pearson	1976	Avington Trout Fishery, Avington	Hampshire	1 year	
	Trout, rainbow (Onchorhynchus mykiss)	18 lb 4 oz	Richard Walker	April 1976	Avington Trout Fishery, Avington	Hampshire	1 year	* Note 8
	Trout, rainbow (Onchorhynchus mykiss)	13 lb 2 oz	Doctor W Drummond	1974	Hampshire Avon, Downton	Wiltshire	2 years	
	Trout, rainbow (Onchorhynchus mykiss)	8 lb 8 oz	Colonel Creagh Scott	1924	Blagdon Lake, Blagdon, Chew Valley,	Somerset	50 years	
	Trout, rainbow (Onchorhynchus mykiss)	5 lb 12 oz	Ernest S Halfold	1923	River Test, Newton Stacey, Test Valley,	Hampshire	1 year	
	Trout, rainbow (Onchorhynchus mykiss)	4 lb	K M Bignall	8 October 1908	Frog Hollow Lake, Belvoir Castle Estate,	Leicestershire	15 years	
	Trout, sea (Salmo trutta)	22 lb 8 oz (equalled)	Mr. S Burgoyne	22 July 1989	River Leven	Dunbartonshire, Scotland	3 years	
	Trout, sea (Salmo trutta)	22 lb 8 oz	S.R Dwight	1946	River Frome, Bindon	Dorset	46 years	* Note 8
	Wels catfish (Silurus glanis)	143 lb	Darren Reitz	29 April 2024	Chigborough Fisheries, Maldon	Essex	6 months	(record as recognised by the BRFC)
	Wels catfish (Silurus glanis)	147 lb	Paul Fyson	7 June 2020	Oak Lakes Fisheries, Southminster	Essex	4 years	* Note 8
	Wels catfish (Silurus glanis)	145 lb	Matthew Smith	24 January 2019	Oak Lakes Fisheries, Southminster	Essex	1 year	* Note 8
	Wels catfish (Silurus glanis)	144 lb	James Jones	30 July 2012	Oak Lakes Fisheries, Southminster	Essex	7 years	* Note 8
	Wels catfish (Silurus glanis)	130 lb	Chris Wade	June 2005	Witch Leisure lake, Hockwold cum Wilton, Thetford	Norfolk	7 years	* Note 8
	Wels catfish (Silurus glanis)	87 lb	Allan Jackson	June 2000	Willow Bank Fisheries, Kirton in Lindsey	Lincolnshire	6 years	* Note 8
	Wels catfish (Silurus glanis)	86 lb 8 oz	Brian Close	May 2000	Willow Bank Fisheries, Kirton in Lindsey	Lincolnshire	Less than 1 year	* Note 8
	Wels catfish (Silurus glanis)	62 lb	Rich Garner	June 1997	Withy pool, Henlow	Bedfordshire	3 years	* Note 10
	Wels catfish (Silurus glanis)	57 lb 4 oz	R Coote	1995	Withy Pool, Henlow	Bedfordshire	2 years	
	Wels catfish (Silurus glanis)	49 lb 12 oz	Steven Pointz	1993	Homersfield Lake, Homersfield	Suffolk	2 years	
	Wels catfish (Silurus glanis)	43 lb 8 oz	Richard Bray	1970	Wilstone Reservoir, Tring Reservoirs	Hertfordshire	23 years	
	Wels catfish (Silurus glanis)	33 lb 12 oz	Reg Hutt	1961	Claydon Middle lake, Steeple Claydon	Buckinghamshire	9 years	
	Zander (Sander lucioperca)	21 lb 5 oz	James Benfield	24 June 2007	Upper Lode Lock, River Severn, near Tewkesbury	Gloucestershire	3 years	* Note 10
	Zander (Sander lucioperca)	19 lb 5 oz 8 dr	Dave Lavender	March 1998	Middle Level Fenland drain	Cambridgeshire	9 years	
	Zander (Sander lucioperca)	18 lb 10 oz	Ray Armstrong	March 1993	River Severn	Worcestershire	5 years	
	Zander (Sander lucioperca)	18 lb 8 oz	Bob Meadows	March 1988	Roswell Pits, Ely	Cambridgeshire	5 years	
	Zander (Sander lucioperca)	17 lb 12 oz	Dave Litton	October 1977	(GORC)	Buckinghamshire	10 years	
	Zander (Sander lucioperca)	15 lb 5 oz	Bill Chillingworth	1971	(GORC)	Buckinghamshire	6 years	
	Zander (Sander lucioperca)	12 lb 13 oz	Neville Fickling	1971	(GORC), Stowe	Buckinghamshire	Less than a year	
	Zander (Sander lucioperca)	12 lb 6 oz 8 dr	Neville Fickling	1971	Great Ouse Relief Channel (GORC), Stowe	Buckinghamshire	Less than a year	

== Anglers who have held multiple British records ==
- Alan Pearson 5 (Rainbow x 3, Brook x 2),
- Dennis Flack 4 (Bitterling, Bleak, Silver Bream, Stickleback )
- Martin Bowler 3 (Barbel, Crucian, Grass carp)
- Neville Fickling 3 (Pike, Zander x 2),
- Grahame King 3 (Barbel x 3),
- Colin Hebb 3 (Ide x 3),
- Richard Walker 2 (Carp, Rainbow),
- Bill Penny 2 (Roach, Orfe)
- Reverend Edward C Alston 2 (Tench, Rudd)
- Mr F.W.K Wallis 2 (Barbel, Chub)
- Simon Lavin 2 (Bream, Grass carp)
- Neill Stephen 2 (Chub, Perch)
- Mat Faulkner 2 (Silver bream, Stickleback)
- Tony Gibson 2 (Barbel x 2)
- Alastair Nicholson 2 (Bream x 2)
- Stuart Morgan 2 (Barbel x 2)

== Ambiguous record claims (no venue given / not accepted / expunged) ==
There have been many ambiguous record claims over the years. Here are a few of those that never made the record list:

- 5 oz 8 dr bleak caught by David Selley on the River Lark 2017. Rejected as a hybrid by BRFC.
- 38 lb Ferox brown trout caught by old Willie Maule. Evidence destroyed by fire.
- 8 lb burbot largest ever recorded in England, caught from the river Trent around 1700–1800. No date/also method of capture unknown.
- 83 lb 4 oz mirror carp called Big Plated caught from Wingham syndicate carp lake in Kent, November 2017. No record claimed - angler wanted no publicity.
- 10 lb 8 oz chub caught from the River Annan in 1955 by Dr. J. A. Cameron. Not authenticated with photo or body scales for examination.
- 5 lb 2 oz crucian caught by Mick Phillips at an undisclosed club lake in Hampshire, August 2021. Assume no DNA presented.
- 1 lb 6 oz dace caught from a Nene tributary February 2016. Angler's name unknown and no record claimed.
- 13 lb 1 oz eel caught by Dave Saunders at Idenwood Fishery, East Sussex in 2010. No independent witnesses.
- 9 lb golden orfe (estimated) caught by Bob Roberts at Anglers Paradise, Devon in February 2009. Not weighed.
- 5 lb grayling caught by Dave Williams from the River Severn near Newtown, Wales, in 2010. Captor ate the evidence with chips and no independent witnesses.
- 6 oz gudgeon caught by Ashley Bennett from the River Wandle in 2016. Not weighed.
- 1 lb 3 oz 4 dr lamprey (river) caught by S.Clews from River Severn in May 1924. No confirmation this fish was caught by rod and line method.
- 6 lb oz perch caught by angler known as Bill from River Thames in March 2014. Assumed reason is lack of independent witnesses.
- 70 lb pike (the largest ever) found dead at River Endrick/Loch Lomond in 1934. Not caught by rod and line.
- 5 lb 2 oz rudd caught by Adrian Cannon from a fenland drain 2012. No independent witnesses.
- 69 lb 12 oz salmon caught by William Home, 8th Earl of Home from the River Tweed in 1730.

== Video footage of chub and carp records ==
- Dean Fletcher's 68 lb 1 oz British record carp, called The Parrot, about to be weighed, January 2016 courtesy of Twitter.
- Neill Stephen's 9 lb 5 oz British record-equaling chub of 2012 at the weigh in, courtesy of YouTube.
- Oz Holness's 67 lb 8 oz British record carp, named Two Tone, being weighed in, 2008 courtesy of YouTube.

== Non-indigenous (invasive) alien species ==
These fish are classed as a significant risk to our native species and if caught must be removed immediately to protect the wider environment and should be reported to the Environment Agency (EA). Anyone found introducing non indigenous (invasive) species to any external body of UK water will be breaching the Import of Live Fish (England and Wales) Act 1980 and will be prosecuted. The fish in question include: black bullhead catfish (Ameiurus melas), doctor fish (Garra rufa), fathead minnow (Pimephales promelas), largemouth bass (Micropterus salmoides), smallmouth bass (Micropterus dolomieu), Siberian sturgeon (Acipenser baerii), sterlet (Acipenser ruthenus), topmouth gudgeon (Pseudorasbora parva), sunbleak (Leucaspius delineatus), and walleye (Sander vitreus).

- Note that this does not apply to non-indigenous fish which are included on the main record list which are carp, crucian carp, goldfish, grass carp, ide, orfe, pumpkinseed, rainbow trout, wels catfish, and zander, which are now considered to be naturalized.

== Notes ==
- Note 1 see Angling records of Europe.
- Note 2 * - This is possibly one of the many records rejected by the BRFC when it was decided to nullify most of the existing British record fish in the purge of 1968, due to lack of creditable evidence.
- Note 3 This fish is listed as either extinct in the UK only, critically endangered species IUCN status, endangered species IUCN status, vulnerable species IUCN status, by the International Union for Conservation of Nature (IUCN).
- Note 4 - It is assumed that wels catfish records were suspended by the BRFC in 2000 due to suspected importation of a fish near to or over the British Record, which could also quite possibly be an infringement of Import of Live Fish (England and Wales) Act 1980.
- Note 5 - No records have been found for pollan (Coregonus pollan) which are found only in Northern Ireland, listed as an endangered species IUCN status.
- Note 6 - No records have been found for spined loach (Cobitis taenia).
- Note 7 - See non indigenous (invasive) species above.
- Note 8 - This record is or was not yet recognised by the BRFC.
- Note 9 - Natural river species (chub, barbel, grayling) will not be recognized when caught in Stillwater, as considered cultivated in a non-natural environment.
- Note 10 - No photographic evidence has been published.
- Note 11 - Possible misidentification of species by BRFC, as similar fish caught 21 years later identified as Channel catfish (Ictalurus punctatus).
