= Richard Walker (angler) =

British angler (1918–1985)

Dick Walker
- Walker and Clarissa 44lb, 1952
- Born: Richard Stuart Walker; 29 May 1918; Hitchin, Hertfordshire
- Died: 2 August 1985 (aged 67)
- Education: Gonville and Caius College, Cambridge
- Spouse: Pat Marston Walker
- Writing career
- Subjects: Angler, Author, Journalist & Broadcaster

This article deals with Richard Stuart Walker, English angler. For other Richard Walkers, see: Richard Walker (disambiguation).

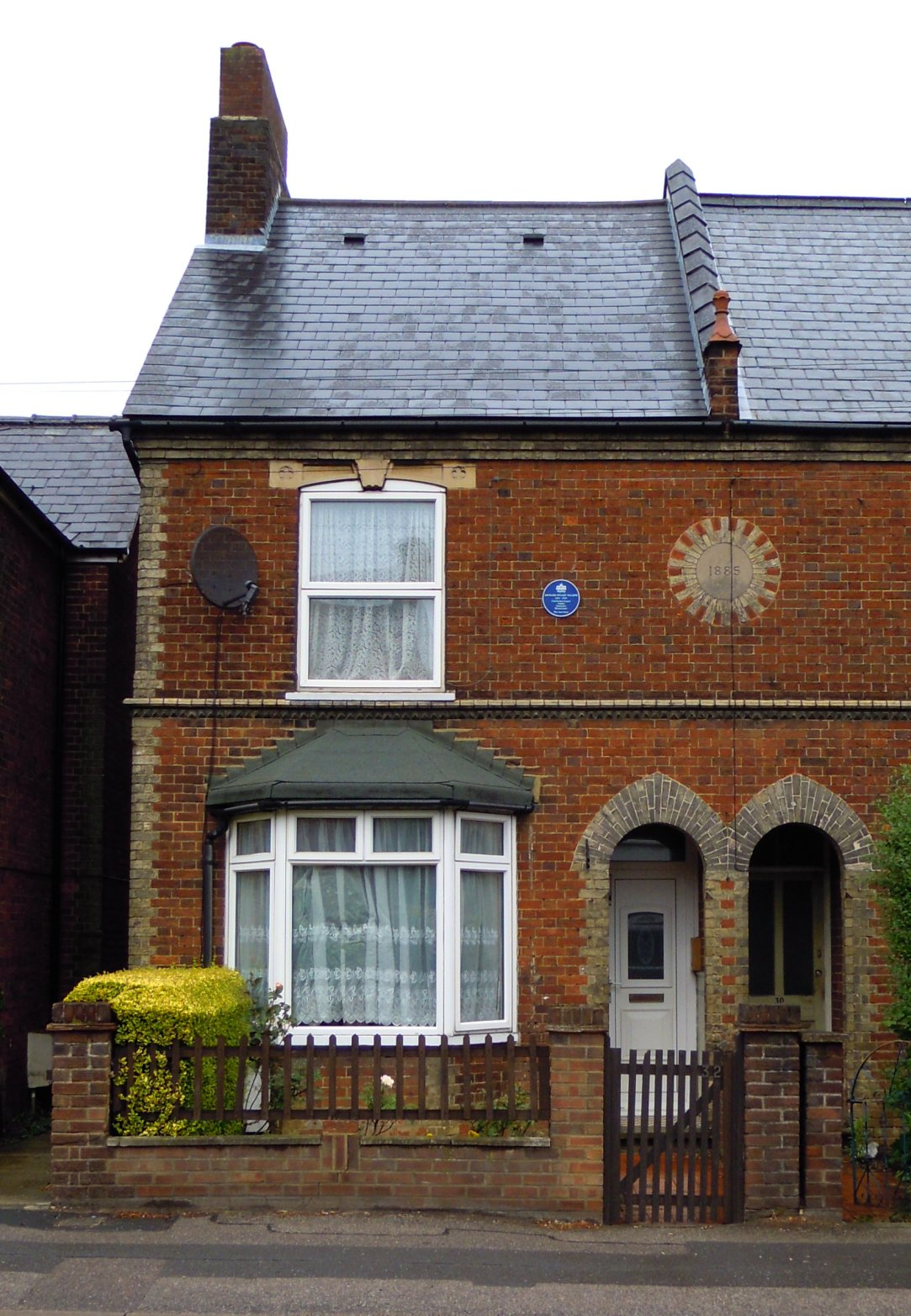
Walker's birthplace at 32 Fishponds Road in Hitchin

Richard Stuart Walker (29 May 1918 – 2 August 1985) was an English angler.

Walker was the first angler to apply scientific thought to angling and wrote many books on the sport. He also wrote for the angling press, most notably for the Angling Times, Trout & Salmon and Fly Dressers' Guild Newsletter. He held the record for a carp in the UK for 28 years with a fish of 44 pounds (20 kg) caught at Redmire pool in Herefordshire.

== Biography ==
Walker was born 29 May 1918, at 32 Fishponds Road in Hitchin, Hertfordshire; he lived there until 1928. His father was a professional soldier, and his mother an employee of the Post Office. He started fishing at an early age, being taught by his grandfather in Hertford. He was educated at the Friends' School in Saffron Walden and St Christopher School in Letchworth. He went to Gonville and Caius College, Cambridge, but his studies were interrupted by the Second World War, during which he worked for the Royal Aircraft Establishment at Farnborough.

After the war he joined Lloyds and Co, manufacturers of high quality grass cutting machinery as technical director. His inventions included the electronic bite alarm, and the arlesey bomb weight, and he was instrumental in the development of the carbon-fibre fishing rod. Considered by many to be one of the best fishermen of the twentieth century, his books are now collector's items. One of his personally handmade Mark IV carp split cane rods is worth some thousands of pounds.

He lived by the River Ivel in Biggleswade from 1978 until his death in 1985, after a long battle with cancer. A biography by Professor Barrie Rickards was published in 2007.

A blue plaque was unveiled on his birthplace in June 2011.

== Walker's British record fish ==
On 13 September 1952, Walker landed the then British record Carp (Cyprinus carpio) at Redmire Pool which weighed 44 lbs. After the fish's capture, he decided to contact London Zoo to verify its weight. After collection the fish was transported to the zoo's aquarium and put on public display. Walker had named the carp Ravioli but the fish was renamed Clarissa. Walker's British record held to 1980, when it was beaten by the 51 lb 8 oz mirror carp caught by Chris Yates.

Walker at one time held the British record for the largest ever Rainbow trout (Onchorhynchus mykiss), caught in Great Britain at the time, which was a fine 18lb 4oz specimen caught at Avington Trout Fisheries on 2nd April 1976. Although not recognised by the BRFC, because Walker never made a claim, the record stood for one year before being beaten with a fish of 18lb 7oz caught by Alan Pearson at the same venue in April 1977.

== Fly fishing ==
Walker was also an innovative fly angler fishing chalk streams, small stillwaters and reservoirs. With the opening of Grafham Water in 1966 Walker concentrated his efforts in addressing the new problems faced at what was at that time the largest man-made stillwater in England. As a result, he was instrumental in the design of many reservoir fly patterns including Walker's Midge Pupa, the Chomper, Longhorns, Mayfly Nymph, Red Sedge, Dambuster, Polystickle, Mrs Palmer, and Sweeney Todd. In August 1969 he began a series of regular monthly articles in Trout & Salmon on new fly patterns entitled Modern Fly Dressings which were subsequently collated into Fly Dressing Innovations and Dick Walker's Modern Fly Dressings. His later years, which were marred by ill health, were spent fishing smaller stillwaters.

== Published works ==
- The Book of the Flemish Giant Rabbit, Idle (c1947) (Note: Published under the name of Stuart Walker)
- Stillwater Angling, David & Charles (1953)
- Walker's Pitch, Angling Times/Allen & Unwin (1959)
- Kapitale Fische Reiche Beute (Walker's Pitch)
- How Fish Feed: Facts on how, when and where, Angling Times (1959)
- Rod Building for Amateurs, Angling Times (1963)
- Carp Fishing, Angling Times (1963)
- No Need to Lie, Angling Times/Allen & Unwin (1964)
- Fly Dressing Innovations, Ernest Benn (1974)
- Successful Angling, Stanley Paul & Co (1977)
- Pesca Deportiva (Successful Angling in Spanish)
- Dick Walker's Trout Fishing on Rivers and Stillwaters, Swan Hill Press (1977)
- The Shell Book of Angling (Editor), David & Charles (1979)
- Dick Walker's Modern Fly Dressings, Ernest Benn (1980)
- Dick Walker's Angling, Angling Times (1980)
- Catching Fish, David & Charles (1981)
- Dick Walker's Coarse Fishing, Patrick Stephens (1983)
- The Best of Dick Walker's Coarse Fishing, David & Charles (1988)
- The Carp Catchers' Club, Medlar Press (1998)
- Drop Me a Line: Being Letters Exchanged with Maurice Ingham on Trout and Coarse Fishing, H F & G Witherby (1989)
- The Stone Walker Letters 1956 - 1983, The Medlar Press (2006)
- Spin Me a Line: Fishing for Fun with Dick Walker, Little Egret Press (2007)
- Walker's Pitch II, Little Egret Press (2008)
- Be My Guest, Peter Maskell Publishing (2010)
