= British Record (Rod Caught) Fish Committee =

The British Record (Rod Caught) Fish Committee -(BRFC) is the official organisation taking responsibility for all angling fish records within the United Kingdom, Northern Ireland and the Channel Islands, collectively known as the "British Records". Since 2009 the BRFC has been part of the Angling Trust

== BRFC Committee ==
The committee is composed of volunteers, including specialists in marine and specialist in freshwater fish, all with specialist knowledge of angling and the natural world and experience working with a background of various organisations, such as the scientific advisors to the Environment Agency and the Natural History Museum, angling organisations such as (SFSA)- Scottish Federation of Sea Anglers. The committee will inspect each claim and adjudicate on its credibility before publishing a list of British Record Fish at regular intervals.

== BRFC Historical Timeline ==
=== 1968 BRFC Purge of British records ===
Formed in 1968, one of the first and most noted decisions was to purge the existing British Record list at the time, to virtually start from scratch, only allowing records that could be verified with photographic evidence, witnesses, tested weighing scales, correct species identification, and other evidential factors. Amongst the casualties were the barbel record of 14lb 6oz shared by Tryon, Wallis and Wheeler, the 10lb 8oz chub of Dr.J.A Cameron, the 4lb 11oz crucian carp of H.C. Hinson, the 1lb 8oz 5dr dace caught by R.W.Humphrey in 1932, a 4lb 8oz silver bream by C.R. Rhind, but most famously of all the 47lb 11oz Loch Lomond pike caught by T.Morgan in 1945, due to not having a photograph of the fish.

=== 1980 Chris Yates's carp ===
The second controversial event was when the BRFC refused to accept Chris Yates 51lb 8oz carp capture in 1980 because at the time the fishes body needed to be provided as evidence, and Yates had returned the carp to the water alive and well. Following this decision, the rule to provide dead fish as evidence was rescinded.

=== 2000 Wels catfish record frozen ===
On 23 October 2000, The BRFC decided that no further claims would be considered for the Wels catfish (Silurus glanis) to prevent the importation of record sized illegal fish. R Garner's 62lb specimen caught at Withy Pool, Henlow in 1997 has been frozen in time as a snapshot of the record as it stood at that time in 2000. On 9 November 2023, the BRFC reinstated the Wels catfish record to the British record fish list (see below).

=== 2007 Grass carp record frozen ===
On 31 October 2007, The BRFC decided that no further claims would be considered for the Grass carp (Ctenopharyngodon idella) to prevent the importation of record sized illegal fish. Phillip Kingsbury's 44lb 8oz specimen caught at Horton Church Lake in 2006 has been frozen in time as a snapshot of the record as it stood at that time in 2007.

=== 2015 Cultivated records ===
In 2015, The BRFC decided to remove the option of 'cultivated' from the game fish record list.

=== 2016 Big Rig ===
In December 2016, The Angling Times reported that the carp "Big Rig" had been rejected as a record on the basis that it had been cultivated, as in being fed to a record weight before being released into the venue where it was finally caught. This was the first time the BRFC had rejected a record coarse fish on the grounds of it being cultivated. The carp had been caught at 69lb 13oz by Tom Doherty on 26 Sept 2016 at The Avenue, RH Fisheries in Shropshire and was subsequently caught again later by Robby Harrison at the largest weight for a carp caught in British waters of 71lb 4oz on 23 Oct 2016, of which also rejected as an official British record.

=== 2016 Michael Mitchell's 34lb 12oz rainbow trout ===
In October 2016, Michael Mitchell landed a 34lb 12oz rainbow trout from Loch Earn in Scotland using maggots. The BRFC rejected the fish as a record on the basis that it had been cultivated, such as being fed to a record weight artificially. The BRFC had withdrawn the cultivated option for record game fish in April 2015.

=== 2017 Captain Jack ===
In November 2017, Carpfeed reported that the carp record claim for "Captain Jack" had been rejected on the basis that the scales were measuring inaccurately; in fact after testing of the scales by a neutral party, they were found to be weighing eight ounces more than they should. The record claim of 68lb 8oz was reduced to 68lb, one ounce below the current record.

=== 2017 Big Plated ===
In November 2017, Carpfeed reported that an 83lb 4oz Mirror carp named "Big Plated" had been landed by an anonymous angler from the Carp Lake at the Wingham syndicate in Kent. Due to the condition of the fish the record was not claimed (see rule 11 below) and the fish was returned.

=== Dec 2017 - BRFC Additional reasons for claim rejection ===
Original reasons why a record fish claim may be rejected:-

- 1. Fish not caught by the fair angling method of using rod and line fish hooked in the mouth by baited hook or lure.
- 2. Captured with assistance, fish must be played and caught by one person only.
- 3. Caught outside of the fishing season. * Note 1.
- 4. Caught in an area where fishing is not permitted. * Note 2.
- 5. Inaccurate scales (although they can be tested later and the weight re-adjusted).
- 6. No photograph (as proof).
- 7. Photo-graphical evidence is of too poor quality and fails to assist the investigation.
- 8. Photograph does not include an identifiable object for size/perspective comparison.
- 9. Witnesses not credible (i.e. family or friends).
- 10. Incorrect species (some fish are susceptible to hybridization).
- 11. Abnormal growth due to disease or other factors.
- 12. Alien species not naturalized as Salmon and Freshwater Fisheries Act 1975, Section 30 (for England and Wales) or the Salmon and Freshwater Fisheries (Consolidation) (Scotland) Act 2003.
- 13. Recently imported fish (Wildlife and Countryside Act 1981).
- 14. Endangered and protected species (such as European Sturgeon, Powan, Allis shad or vendace.
- 15. Freshwater species not already on the record list, such as Spined loach(Cobitis taenia) or Ninespine stickleback /Ten-spined stickleback(Pungitius pungitius).
- 16. Cultivated as in "grown to record weight using an artificial feeding scheme, before being released into the venue of capture".

[Note 1: Even if closed season is no longer applicable today, an unfair advantage was gained at that time.] [Note 2: It is only fair that records are only accepted if caught at a venue where it would be possible for any member of the public can seek approval for fishing.]

BRFC additional advice to claimants added 01/12/2017:- Following the Big Rig episode, the British Record fish committee advised any future potential freshwater record claimants, the following issues would be considered and scrutinised during the confirmation process:

- The weight of the fish at stocking into the venue of capture.
- The length of time the fish has lived in the venue of capture since stocking.
- The historical background of the fish and its origins prior to being stocked.
- Whether the fish attained this weight by feeding on a natural diet/anglers’ baits only, or had supplementary food or other treatments been involved.
- Historical evidence to analyse the lifetime growth the fish.
- Consideration to whether the fish's weight would be naturally sustainable in that fishery.

This is to prevent any attempts to introduce record-size fish via imports, as in the case of the Wels catfish, or manipulate records by cultivating record-size fish as was the case with Big Rig.

=== 2021 Jensen Price carp ===
On 19 July 2021, at an online BRFC ratification meeting, it was decided to reject Jensen Price's carp of 73lb 8oz caught from Holme Fen fishery, as it contravened BRFC additional advice to claimants added 01/12/2017, about unnatural growth rate of carp being unsustainable if naturally fed.

=== 2024 Wels catfish record reinstated ===
On 9 November 2023, after discussion with the Catfish Conservation Group, the BRFC decided to reinstate the Wels catfish record to the British record fish list, after being frozen for 23 years, with claims open for fish over 130lb.

== Fish Records ==
For a list of historical fish records see: Angling records in the UK. A majority, though not all of these records have been recognised by the BRFC. BRFC recognised record lists are accessible directly from the links below.
