= Arlesey Bomb =

Angling weight

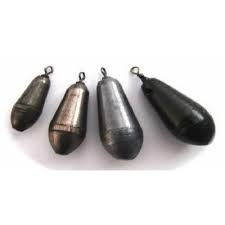
Arlesey Bomb

The Arlesey Bomb is an angling weight developed by Richard Walker at the lake in Arlesey. Walker fished for perch in the lake, and very large perch could be caught in the deepest water. The Arlesey Bomb was developed to allow him to cast the long distances required. It is tear-shaped, with a loop at the top to attach the line. Its shape makes it aerodynamic to cast, but unlikely to snag on the river or lake bottom. The incorporation of a swivel also prevented the line getting twisted.
