= Redmire Pool =

Lake in Herefordshire, England

Coordinates: 51.894°N 2.666°W

Redmire Pool is near Ross-on-Wye in Herefordshire, England. At only 3 acres (1.2 ha) in size it is considered by angling experts to be the home of carp fishing. The earliest sign of its potential was unveiled on 3 October 1951 when a British record carp of 31.25 lb (14.17 kg) was caught by Bob Richards. The water was made famous by Richard Walker who caught a British record carp, weighing 44 lb (20 kg), overnight on 13 September 1952. The fish, a common carp, was transferred to the London Zoo aquarium. She was initially given the name Ravioli by Walker and named Clarissa by the staff of London Zoo.

The record was beaten by another Redmire fish when, on 16 June 1980, Chris Yates caught the then record UK carp of 51.5 lb (23.4 kg). The fish, a linear mirror carp, was actually caught on a split cane rod that Richard Walker had made in 1955. Current and previous UK angling records can be found at Rod Caught Fish Records UK.

The pool probably dates from the 1600s, but the carp fishing interest began in 1934 when the then owners of the estate instructed a fish supplier by the name of Donald Leney to stock the pool with 50 small carp (5.5–8 in, 14–20 cm) in a bid to combat the extensive weed in the pool. Stocking of these fish, since known as "Leneys", at Redmire and elsewhere around mainly southern England have produced most of the known big carp in England.

Redmire features in the BBC2 angling series A Passion for Angling.

The pool is part of the 120-acre (49 ha) Bernithan Court estate which was sold to new owners in 2019. The fishing on the pool was the estate's main source of income.
