= Chigborough Lakes =

Nature reserve in Maldon, Essex, England

Coordinates: 51.745°N 0.717°E

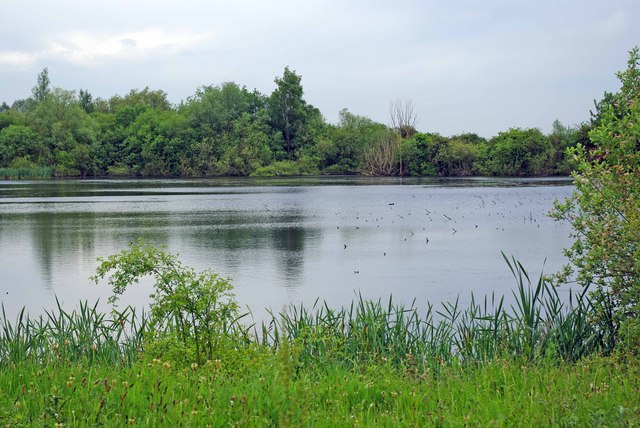
- Interactive map of Chigborough Lakes
- Type: Nature reserve
- Location: Maldon, Essex
- OS grid: TL 876 086
- Area: 18.6 hectares (46 acres)
- Manager: Essex Wildlife Trust

Chigborough Lakes is an 18.6-hectare (46-acre) nature reserve in Maldon in Essex. It is managed by the Essex Wildlife Trust.

This area of former gravel pits has diverse habitats, lakes, marshes, willow carr, grazed grassland and scrub. More than 120 species of bird have been recorded, out of which over 40 have bred, including great crested grebes, grey herons and little egrets. There are eleven species of willow and several of orchid.

Access to the site is from Chigborough Road.
