= Llandegveth =

Village in Monmouthshire, Wales

Coordinates: 51°39′18″N 2°57′20″W

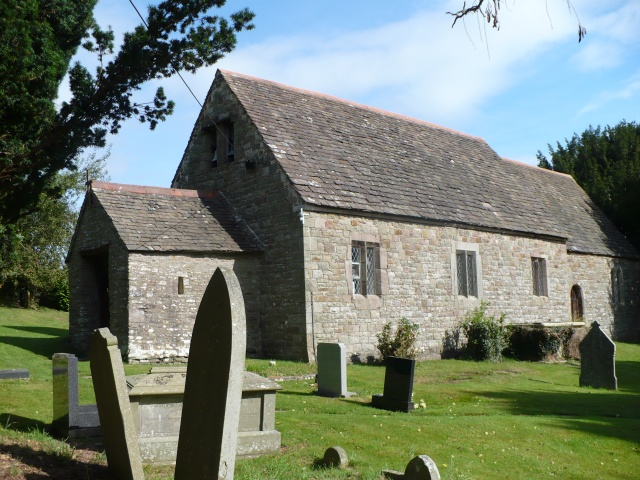
St Tegfedd's church

Llandegveth, also known by its Welsh name Llandegfedd, is a village in Monmouthshire, south east Wales. It is located between Cwmbran, in Torfaen, and Usk in rural Monmouthshire.

== History and amenities ==
The parish church, dedicated to Saint Tegfedd, was once called Merthyr Tegfedd. It originates from the early Norman period, but was extensively restored in the 19th century. It has a fine example of a medieval, curved embanked churchyard.

Llandegfedd Reservoir, located nearby, is named after the village. It is famous for coarse fishing and holds record pike. It is also popular for open-water diving, sailing and waterskiing.
