= Furner's Green =

Coordinates: 51.0164°N 0.0081°E

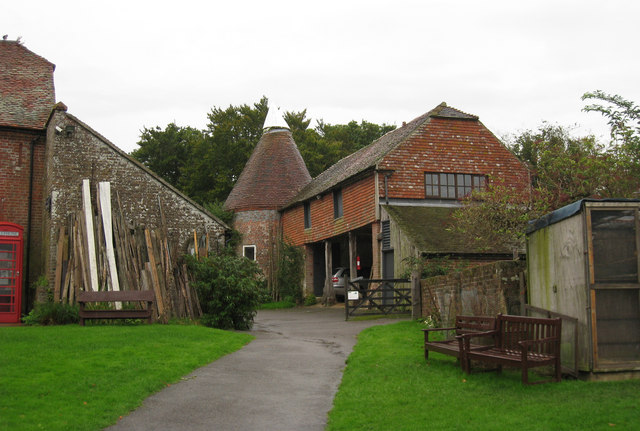

- Location within East Sussex
- OS grid reference: TQ409262
  - London: 33 miles (53 km) N
- Civil parish: Danehill
- District: Wealden
- Shire county: East Sussex
- Region: South East
- Country: England
- Sovereign state: United Kingdom
- Post town: UCKFIELD
- Postcode district: TN22
- Dialling code: 01825
- Police: Sussex
- Fire: East Sussex
- Ambulance: South East Coast
- UK Parliament: Wealden

Furner's Green is a hamlet in the civil parish of Danehill in East Sussex, England.

== Geography ==
Furner's Green lies on the Greenwich Meridian about 9 miles (14 km) north-west of Uckfield and approximately 7 miles (11 km) to the east of Haywards Heath on the southern edge of Ashdown Forest.

== Geology ==
Lime kilns at Annwood Farm ('Handwood Farm' on the 1795 Ordnance Survey map) are shown on the 1875 Ordnance Survey map. Lime would have been used locally to improve the heavy, clay-rich Wealden soil, in the mixing of mortar for construction, and was also used in Sussex for plasterwork and 'white washing'. There is no evidence of limestone outcropping in this area, but Sussex does have small workable outcrops of 'Sussex Marble' or 'Winklestone' and so it is likely that chalk was imported to this location from the chalk workings of the South Downs. The abundance of local timber in the nearby Annwood and Maskett's Wood would have been invaluable for lime manufacture

== History ==
In William Gardener's 1795 map of Sussex (1 inch to a mile scale), which was to some part based on the findings of an earlier (1778) survey by himself and Thomas Yeakell, Furner's Green is called 'Turners Green'. A later anomaly can be found in the 1879 recollections of Thomas Chatfield, a long-time resident of the area, who is reported to call the hamlet 'Furriers Green'

Colin Godman's Farm has been traced back to at least 1550 and reputedly was for a while involved in the smuggling of wool for export. It, and other substantial properties are clearly marked on the 1875 Ordnance Survey map. John Baker-Holroyd (later Baron Sheffield) is noted as owning the property in 1768 records

== The iron industry ==
The iron workings at Sheffield Mill are reported in detail by John Shreve, master of works during the reigns of Henry VIII and Edward VI.

A lease agreement dating to 1580 refers to the 'decaied Ironworks, sometimes called the furnes for the casting of raw iron there'. On the site there is also a 'corne' mill. The degree of development at Sheffield Mill, simply for grinding corn, was substantial at that time, for mention is made of 'banks, baies, ponds, waters, watercourses, waterlaies, fludgates and waterworcks'. The hammer mill and forge required waterwheels, bellows, coal houses and places in which to work the material. And yet, to visit the site now, evidence of this industrial history is almost gone.

== Land ownership ==
Before selling of properties in the early to mid twentieth century, many of the properties in Furner's Green were part of the Sheffield Park or Danehurst estates.
