= Kings Weir =

Weir on the River Lea in Hertfordshire, England

Coordinates: 51.728120°N 0.013116°W

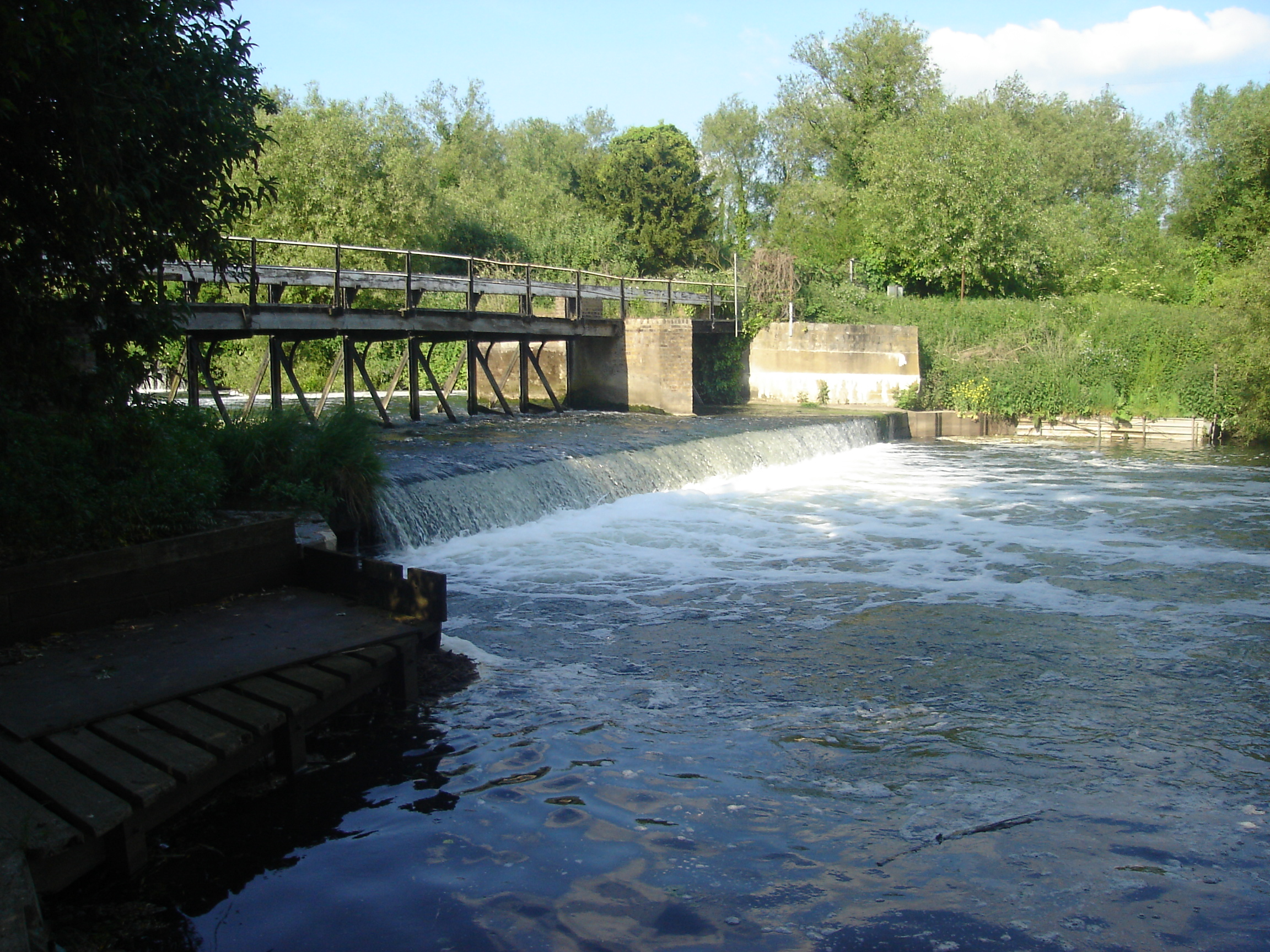
The weir

Kings Weir is a weir on the River Lea near Turnford and Nazeing in Hertfordshire, England.

== Ecology ==
It is a well known fishery where barbel can be caught.

== Access ==
Pedestrian and cycle access from the Lee Valley Walk. Vehicular access at Wormley.

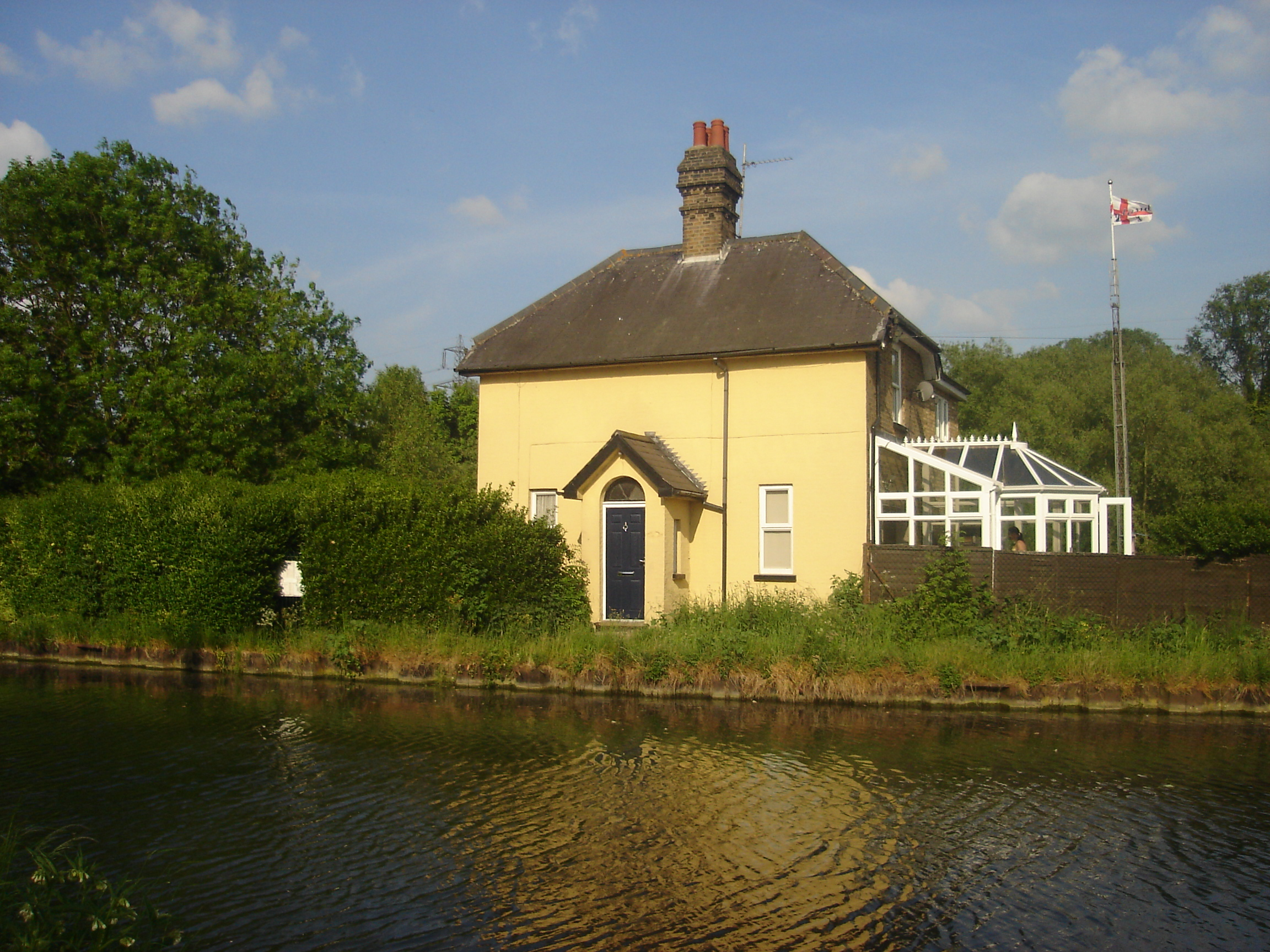
The weir-keeper's cottage
