= Fen Drayton Lakes =

Series of lakes in Cambridgeshire, England

Fen Drayton Lakes, Cambridgeshire
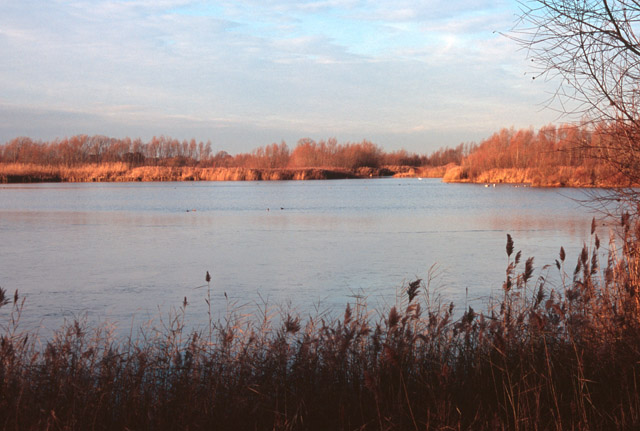
- Fen Drayton nature reserve

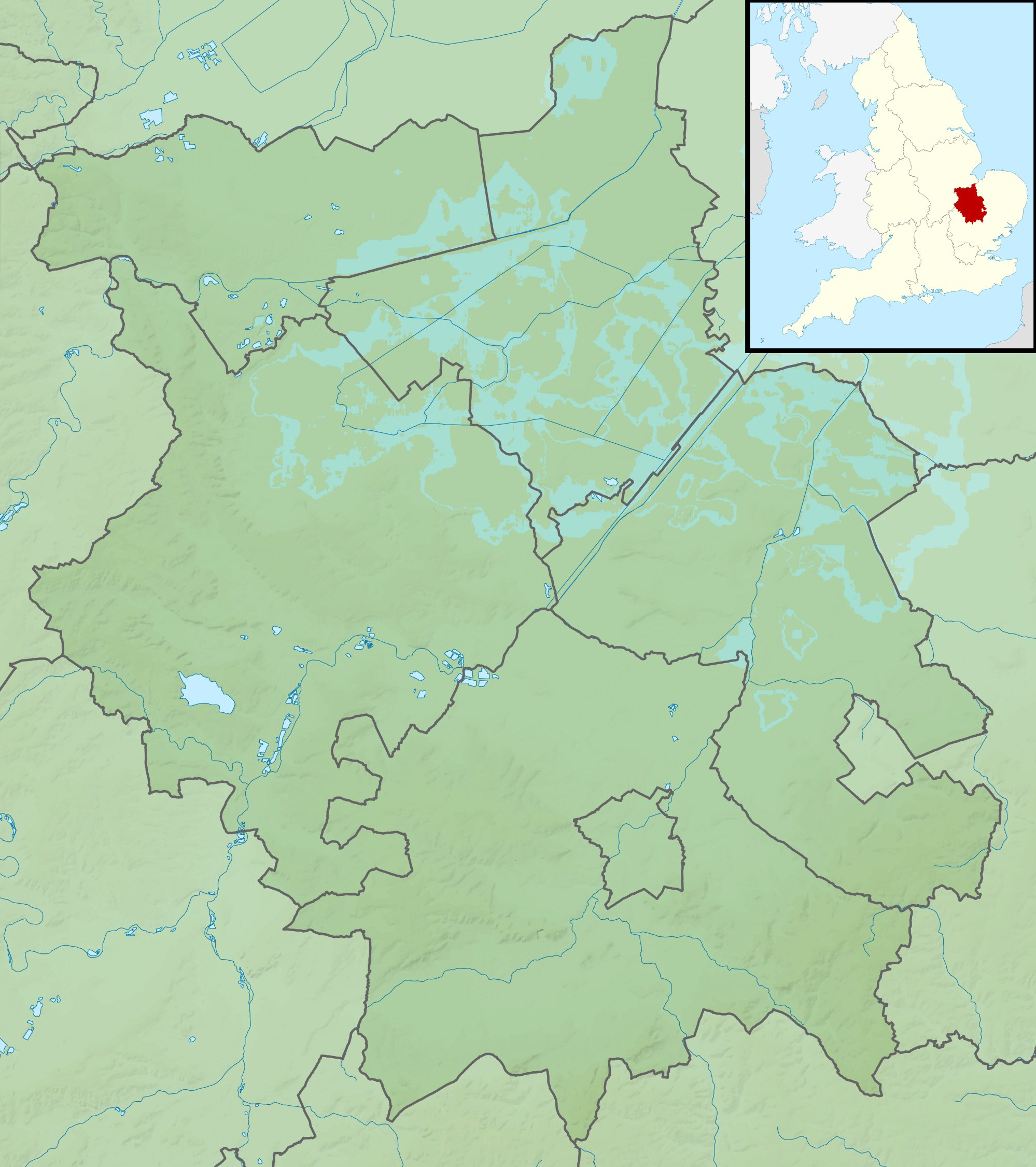
- Location within Cambridgeshire
- Location: Cambridgeshire
- Coordinates: 52.308°N 0.037°W
- Type: Lakes
- Basin countries: United Kingdom
- Surface area: 267 acres (1.08 km^{2})
- Max. depth: 5 m (16 ft)

Fen Drayton Lakes is a complex of lakes, lagoons, ponds and a river, situated close to Fen Drayton, Holywell and Swavesey in Cambridgeshire, England. The complex was formerly a gravel extraction site until 1992 when gravel production ceased and the pits were allowed to flood to provide a nature reserve and bird sanctuary.

== Waters ==
All the waters on the complex were created in the process of gravel extraction site which started in 1953 and continued until 1992 when gravel production ceased. The extraction pits naturally filled with water and preserved as a nature reserve and RSPB bird sanctuary. The complex consists of 12 waters; Drayton Fen (90 acres (36 ha)), Ferry Lagoon (160 acres (65 ha)), Ferry pond, Ferry mere, Holywell lake, Swavesey lake (30 acres (12 ha)), Oxholme Lake, Moore Lake, Far Fen lake, Elney Lake, Trout pond, Springhill lagoon, located alongside the River Great Ouse.

== Bird species ==
Since the extraction of gravel began in 1953, at least 213 species have been recorded in the area with some 65 species being regular breeders. Recent bird species sighted include barn owl, bittern, blackcap, honey buzzard, common crane, cormorant, great egret, little egret, red-footed falcon, black-headed gull, goldeneye, marsh harrier, purple heron, hobby, glossy ibis, kingfisher, sanderling, snipe, starling, bearded tit, Cetti's warbler, reed warbler, willow warbler, and whiskered tern.

== Angling ==
Fishing is available via syndicate membership on Drayton Fen, Ferry Lagoon, Holywell Lake and Swavesey Lake and the water contains specimen carp, bream, tench, roach, rudd, eel and perch. These lakes are prone to flooding and as such fish populations are not known. Ferry Lagoon has three times been the site of British record sized bream. A 19lb 10oz fish was landed in March 2005, a 22lb 9oz one in September 2009, then a 22lb 11oz specimen in April 2012.

== Gallery ==
Fen Drayton Lakes

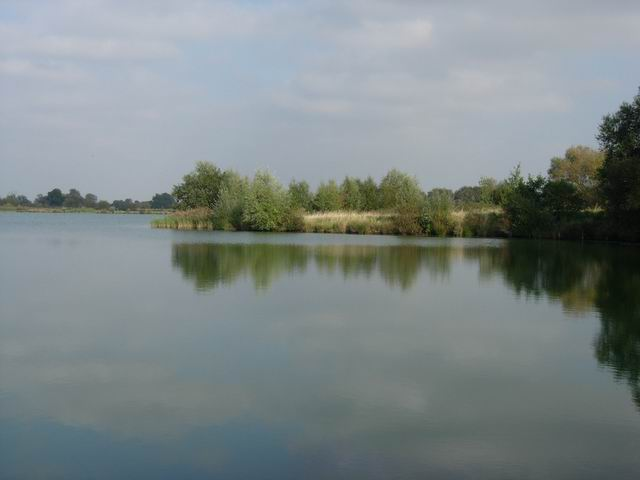
Ferry lagoon

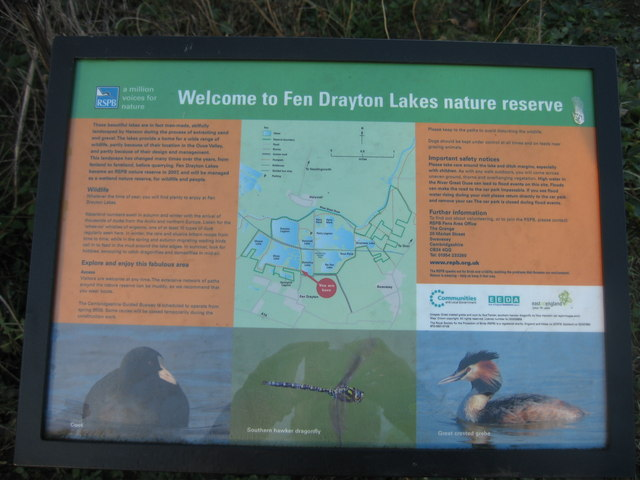
Fen Drayton information display

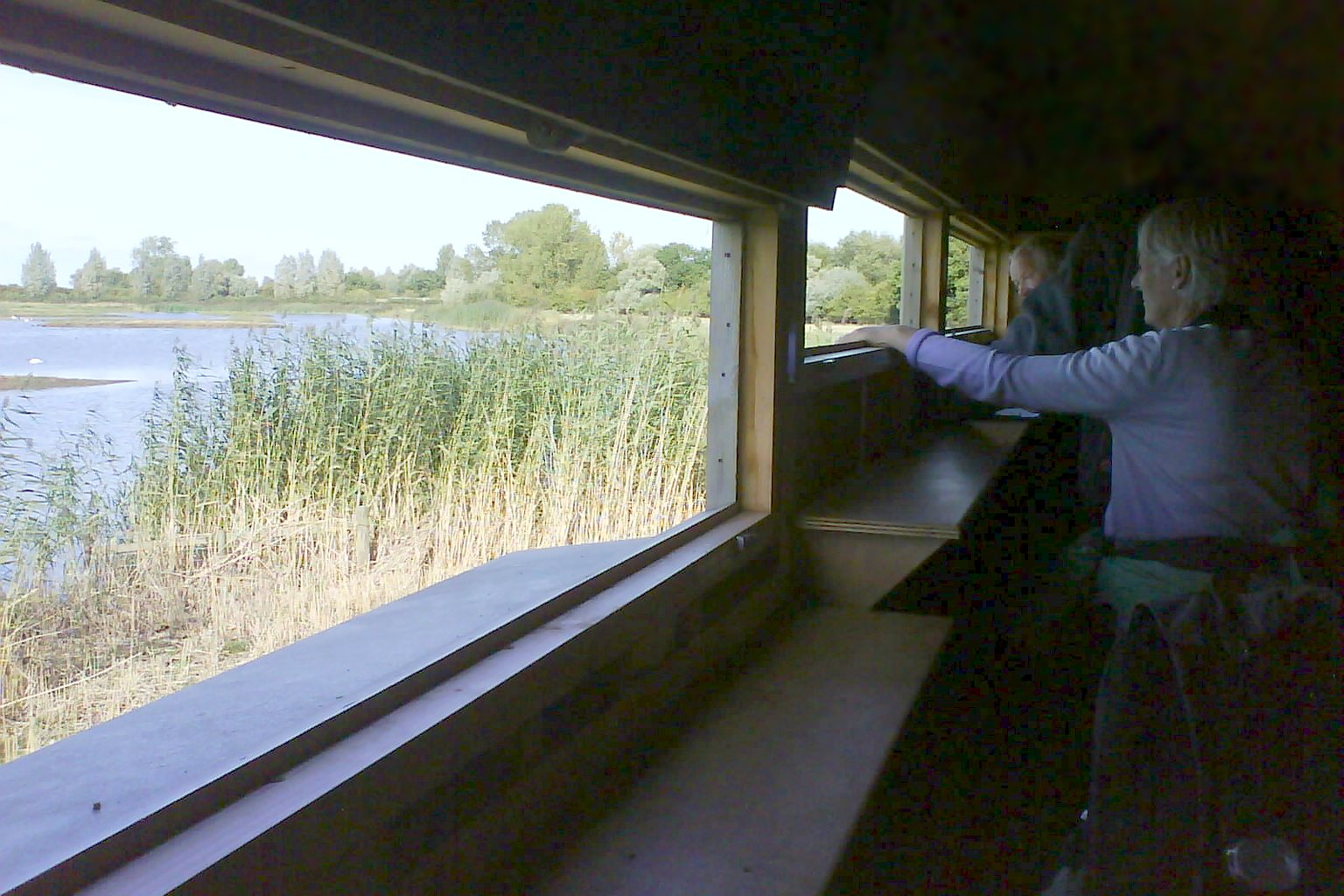
RSPB bird hide
