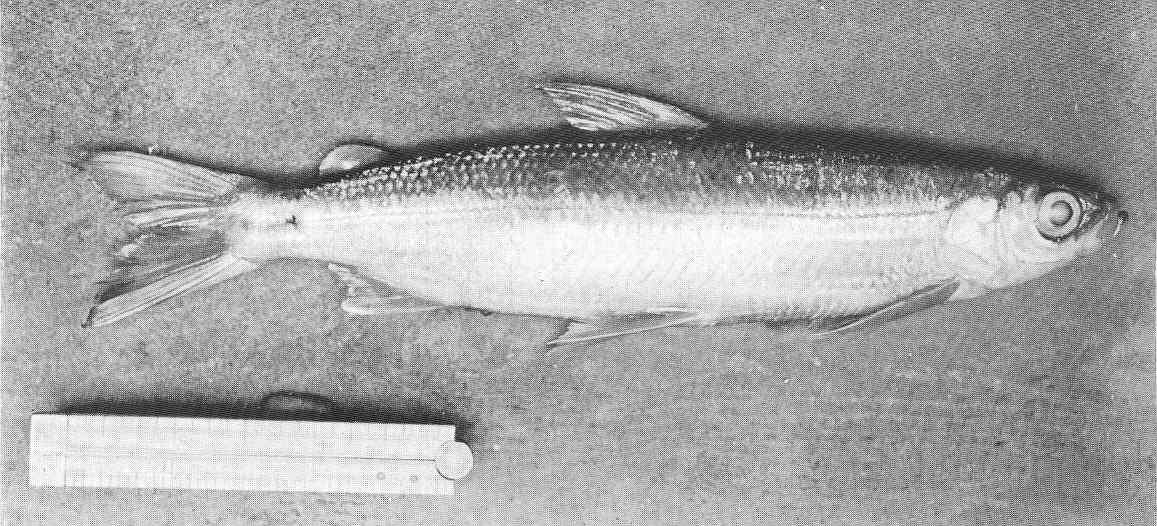
- Individual caught in 1904

Conservation status
- Endangered (IUCN 3.1)

Scientific classification
- Kingdom: Animalia
- Phylum: Chordata
- Class: Actinopterygii
- Division: Teleostei
- Order: Salmoniformes
- Family: Salmonidae
- Genus: Coregonus
- Species: C. pennantii

Binomial name
- Coregonus pennantii Valenciennes, 1848

= Gwyniad =

Species of fish

The gwyniad (Coregonus pennantii), or Welsh whitefish, is a species of freshwater ray-finned fish belonging to the family Salmonidae, which includes the salmon, trouts and related fishes. This species is endemic to a single lake in North Wales.

== Taxonomy ==
The gwyniad was first formally described in 1848 by the French zoologist Achille Valenciennes in volume 21 of the Histoire naturelle des poissons, cowritten with Georges Cuvier. Valenciennes gave the type locality as Wales. This fish is classified in the Holarctic whitefish genus Coregonus which is classified in the subfamily Coregoninae of the family Salmonidae.

The taxonomy of the genus Coregonus is disputed; some authorities assign the gwyniad to the common whitefish (Coregonus lavaretus), and a morphological review in 2012 was unable to find any solid evidence for recognizing the gwyniad as a separate species. Eschmeyer's Catalog of Fishes, FishBase and the IUCN list it as a distinct species, C. pennantii.

== Etymology ==
The gwyniad belongs to the genus Coregonus, this name was coined by Peter Artedi in 1738 for C. lavaretus and combines core, derived from kórē which means the pupil in Greek, with gōnía, an "angle" or "corner", an allusion to the front part of the pupil protruding at an acute angle. The specific name, pennantii, honours the Welsh naturalist and author Thomas Pennant who wrote about the gwyniad in 1769, referring to it as C. lavaretus.

== Distribution and habitat ==
The gwyniad is endemic to Llyn Tegid (Bala Lake) in the upper drainage system of the River Dee in the county of Gwynedd in north Wales. This species is found in the benthopelagic zone in the deeper parts of the two lakes it now inhabits but it undertakes daily vertical migrations to forage nearer the surface in the warmer months of the year.

== Conservation ==
The gwyniad is threatened by deteriorating water quality in Llyn Tegid and by the ruffe (Gymnocephalus cernua), a fish introduced to the lake in the 1980s and now eating the eggs and fry of gwyniad. As a conservation measure, eggs of gwyniad were transferred to Llyn Arenig Fawr, a nearby reservoir, between 2003 and 2007.

== See also ==
- Powan
- Schelly
- Vendace
