= Schelly =

Conservation status
- Vulnerable (IUCN 3.1)

Scientific classification
- Kingdom: Animalia
- Phylum: Chordata
- Class: Actinopterygii
- Division: Teleostei
- Order: Salmoniformes
- Family: Salmonidae
- Genus: Coregonus
- Species: C. stigmaticus

Binomial name
- Coregonus stigmaticus (Regan, 1908)

Species of fish

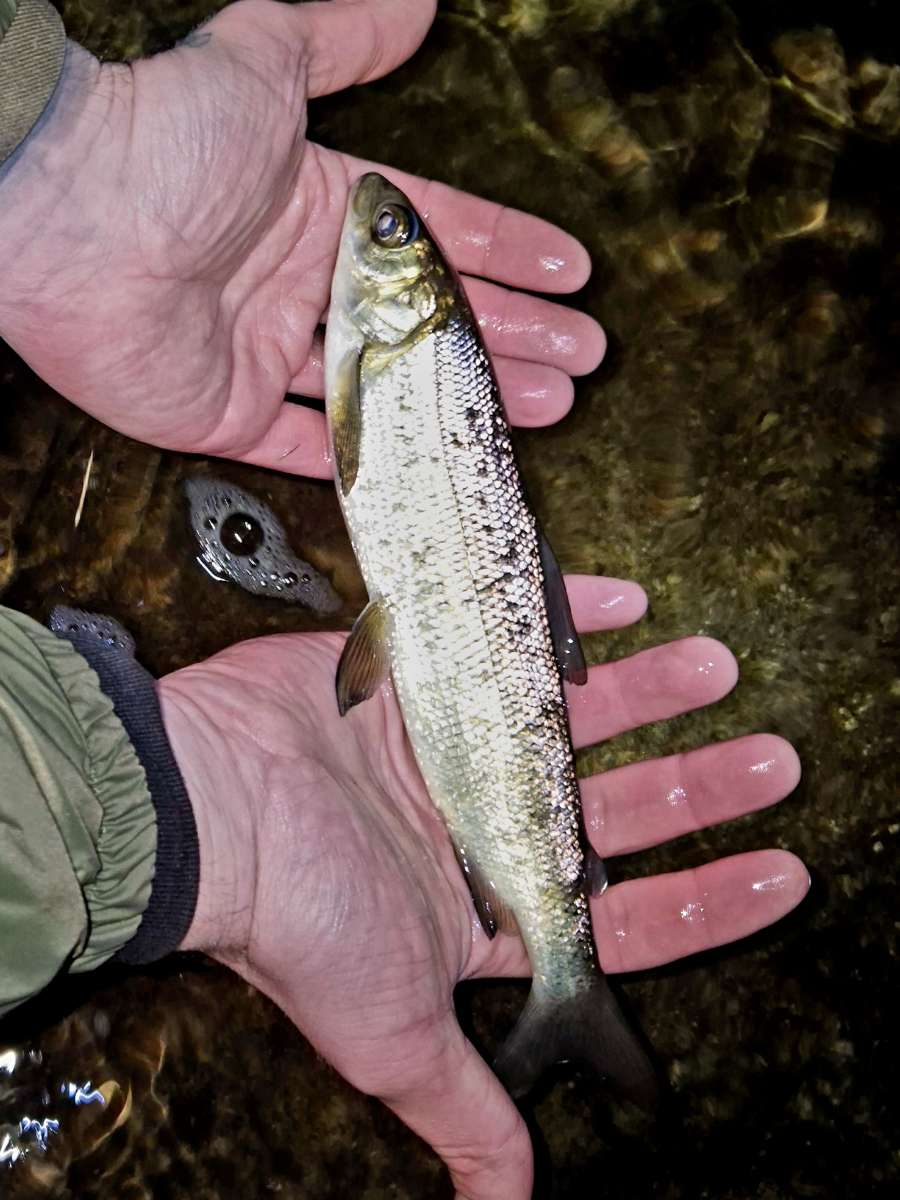
Schelly fish

The schelly (Coregonus stigmaticus) is a living fresh water fish of the salmon family, endemic to four lakes in the Lake District, England. Its taxonomy is disputed with some recognizing it as a distinct species and others as a variant of the widespread Eurasian whitefish species Coregonus lavaretus. It is present in Brothers Water, Haweswater, Red Tarn and Ullswater, and the population seems stable in all of these except for Haweswater where it seems to be declining. The main threats it faces are seen to be water abstraction and cormorants, and the fish-eating birds are being culled from Haweswater. The International Union for Conservation of Nature has rated the conservation status of this fish as "Vulnerable".

== Taxonomy ==
In Britain the schelly populations are usually considered as members of the widespread Eurasian whitefish species Coregonus lavaretus, or common whitefish, as with the Welsh gwyniad and Scottish powan. This is supported by morphological evidence, as a review was unable to find any solid evidence for treating them as separate. The schelly is listed as a distinct species of whitefish, C. stigmaticus, in FishBase and by the IUCN.

== Distribution ==
Schelly is the common name of four populations of freshwater whitefish in the English Lake District, Cumbria. The native populations of this fish inhabit the Brothers Water, Haweswater, Red Tarn and Ullswater, and occupy a total area of about 20 square kilometres (7.7 sq mi). Apart from Haweswater, the populations appear stable.

== Status ==
At Haweswater, the fishery officers are now culling all of the cormorants that visit the lake, in order to protect the endangered fish. An analysis of reservoir management data over a 30-year period (1961–1991) has revealed that the decline of the schelly population is associated with increased water abstraction and reduced water levels. Entrapment during abstraction is not significant. Year class strength is probably determined by lake levels during the January–March spawning and incubation period whereas subsequent growth rate is influenced by lake levels during June–October.
