= Avington, Hampshire =

Village and parish in Hampshire, England

Coordinates: 51.0847°N 1.2443°W

Avington
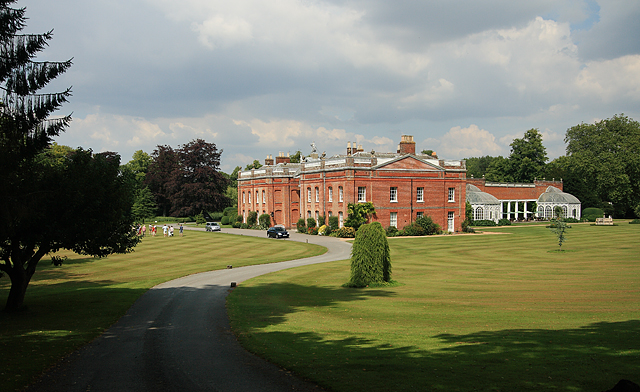
- Avington Park

- Location within Hampshire
- OS grid reference: SU530319
- Civil parish: Itchen Valley
- District: Winchester
- Shire county: Hampshire
- Region: South East
- Country: England
- Sovereign state: United Kingdom
- Post town: Winchester
- Postcode district: SO21
- Dialling code: 01962
- Police: Hampshire and Isle of Wight
- Fire: Hampshire and Isle of Wight
- Ambulance: South Central
- UK Parliament: Winchester

Avington is a village in the civil parish of Itchen Valley, in the Winchester district, in the county of Hampshire, England. In 1931 the parish had a population of 198. On 1 April 1932 the parish was abolished to form Itchen Valley.

It is located on the banks of the River Itchen to the northeast of the city of Winchester.

It is mentioned in a folk song, "Avington Pond", on the CD Folk Songs of Hampshire.

== History ==
In 1830, the village was the site of an agricultural disturbance after workers attempted to destroy threshing machines but were prevented by a local magistrate and some landowners.

== Landmarks ==
The house in Avington Park dates back to the late sixteenth century, but was considerably altered in 1670 by the addition of two wings and a classical portico. The owner of Avington at this time was George Brydges, one of Charles II's courtiers. On the death of George Brydges's son in 1751 Avington Park passed to his cousin James Brydges, Marquess of Carnarvon, who became 3rd Duke of Chandos in 1771. He carried out major alterations in the late eighteenth century, and was also responsible for the building of the parish church which overlooks the park.

The house is now privately owned and is Grade I Listed. Parts of the house can be visited in the summer months and bank holidays between 2.30 p.m and 5:00 p.m. Apart from original painted frescoes and gilding (redone with an English Heritage grant in 2000) there is much to see including a Grinling Gibbons mirror, a William De Morgan jug and several mementos from the Battle of Trafalgar.

== Religious sites ==
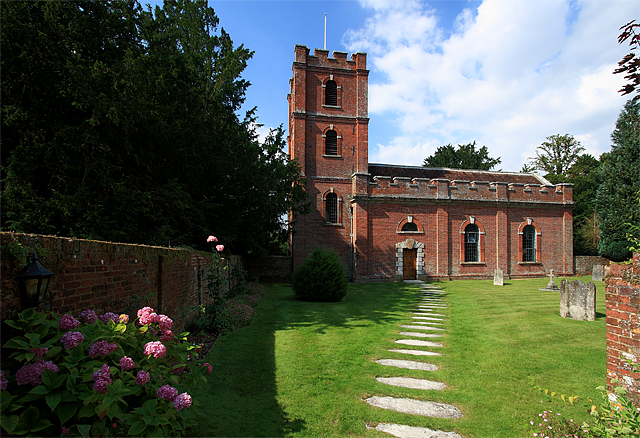
Church of St Mary, Avington

The Church of England parish church, dedicated to St Mary, was founded by Margaret, Marchioness of Carnarvon (d. 1768), with construction costs defrayed by her husband, James Brydges, 3rd Duke of Chandos. It was constructed 1768–71 in red brick to a design by an unknown local architect. The exterior Georgian architecture and crenellated tower echo the style of nearby Avington Park.

The interior, as well as containing memorials to the Brydges family and Percy Bysshe Shelley's brother, John, includes a two-deck pulpit and box pews reputedly made from Spanish mahogany taken from one of the Armada fleet.

St Mary's Avington is a constituent church of the Itchen Valley parish.

== Notable people ==
- George Ernest Shelley (1840–1910), geologist and ornithologist, born in Avington

== Avington ravens ==
In Adventures Among Birds (1913), the naturalist W. H. Hudson describes the last of the "inland-breeding" ravens in Hampshire. These birds lived in the trees of Avington Park. Hudson relates that at some time in the 1840s the family who lived in the house contracted a man ("a champion tree-climber") to climb a tree and gather some fledglings that could be kept as pets. These birds were tamed and, although they were not pinioned and often left the confines of the park, always returned to roost. These young birds were unfortunately all killed by their jealous parents. Hudson claims that ravens continued to breed in Avington until around 1885, at which time – following human persecution – there were no remaining breeding pairs.
