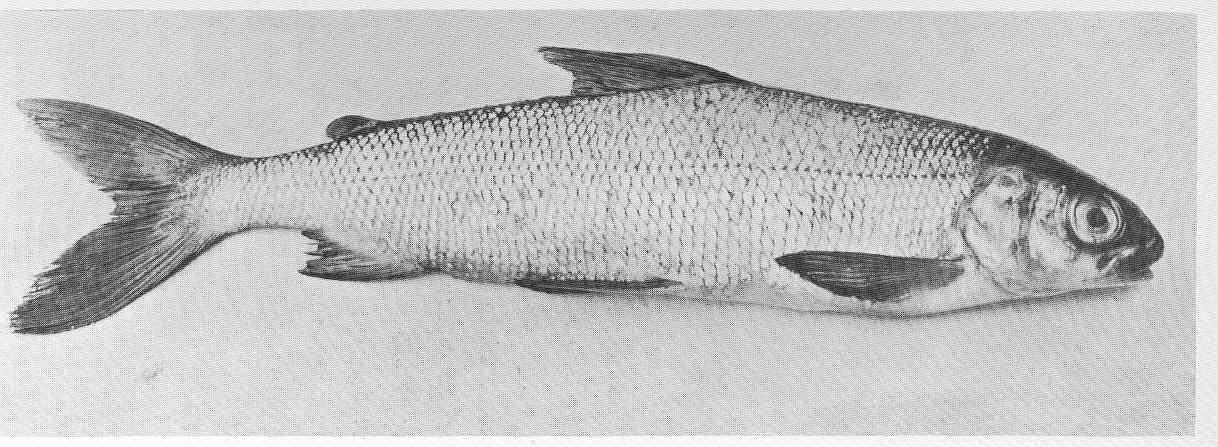

Conservation status
- Vulnerable (IUCN 3.1)

Scientific classification
- Kingdom: Animalia
- Phylum: Chordata
- Class: Actinopterygii
- Division: Teleostei
- Order: Salmoniformes
- Family: Salmonidae
- Genus: Coregonus
- Species: C. clupeoides

Binomial name
- Coregonus clupeoides Lacépède, 1803

Synonyms
- Coregonus cepedii Valenciennes, 1848; Coregonus lacepedei Parnell, 1838; Coregonus microcephalus Parnell, 1838

= Powan =

Species of fish

The powan (Coregonus clupeoides) is a kind of freshwater whitefish endemic to two lochs in Scotland, Loch Lomond and Loch Eck. It has been successfully introduced in two other sites, Loch Sloy and the Carron Valley Reservoir.

Powan populations are relatively healthy, but may have been negatively impacted by the introduced ruffe, which eats powan eggs and fry. As a conservation action, an attempt to establish populations in four additional lochs has been undertaken.

The taxonomic status of the British whitefish populations, including powan, is a matter of debate. Currently the Scottish powan, along with the Welsh gwyniad known from a single lake, and four similar populations in England known as schelly, are generally considered belonging to the widespread Eurasian common whitefish (Coregonus lavaretus). This accords with the close genetic similarity among these units, and the absence of clear morphological differences between them. FishBase and the IUCN continue to recognize the Scottish powan as a distinct species, Coregonus clupeoides.

== Ecology ==
This fish is benthopelagic, feeding on the lakebed on insect larvae and crustaceans. In Loch Lomond, this fish exhibits a pattern of daily migration to feeding sites and of seasonal migration to breeding grounds. Before the breeding season, the mature males begin to congregate in deep water near the spawning beds; these are shallow areas of gravel and pebbles washed by waves. In late December and January they move into the shallows where they are joined by the ripe females, and spawning is completed by early February, after which the fish disperse to other parts of the loch. The eggs are eaten by brown trout (Salmo trutta), common roach (Rutilus rutilus), other powan and Phryganea larvae, and the adult powan are heavily predated by the northern pike (Esox lucius) at breeding time.
