= Chris Yates (fisherman) =

English angler, photographer and author

Christopher Yates (born 19th April 1948) is an English angler, photographer, broadcaster, tea connoisseur and author. He is a former holder of the record for the heaviest-recorded British carp, a 51lb 6oz specimen captured from Redmire pool in 1980. Yates is a former co-editor (with Jon Ward-Allen) of Waterlog magazine, and is a regular contributor to The Idler.

Yates prefers vintage tackle, particularly split-cane rods and centrepin reels, and regards cane as superior to any other rod-making material. His books and films emphasise being close to nature as one of the principal pleasures of fishing.

== Television series ==
Yates was one of two central characters in BBC2's 1993 TV series A Passion for Angling, made by Hugh Miles and also featuring Bob James, in which the pair go fishing for carp, salmon and other species across Britain. The series was shown in many countries including Mexico, Hong Kong, New Zealand, Italy, Norway and Japan.

== Radio ==
Between 1996 and 2006 Yates presented numerous BBC radio documentaries, all produced by Dan Shepherd of Far Shoreline Productions. They included 'Fishing for Doubters', 'The Case of the Missing Burbot', 'Nocturne' and 'Fish Tales'. In 2020 Yates presented 'Reading the Water' and in 2022 'Reading the Air', both for BBC Radio 4.

== Published works ==
- The Secret Carp, Merlin Unwin Books 1992 (ISBN 1873674058)
- A Passion for Angling (with Rodger McPhail), BBC Books/Merlin Unwin Books 1993 (ISBN 978-0563367413)
- Casting at the Sun, Medlar Press limited edition 1986, Classics edition 2006 (ISBN 978-1899600366)
- The Deepening Pool, Unwin Hyman 1990 (ISBN 0044405774)
- Falling In Again, Merlin Unwin Books 1998 (ISBN 978-1873674338)
- Four Seasons, Medlar Press 1996, 2nd Edition 2008 (ISBN 978-1899600854)
- River Diaries, Medlar Press 1997, 2nd Edition 2010 (ISBN 978-1907110023)
- The River Prince, (Ed.) Medlar Press 1998, 2nd Edition 2009 (ISBN 978-1899600656)
- Shadows & Reflections, (Ed.) Medlar Press 1999, 2nd Edition 2010 (ISBN 978-1907110061)
- How to Fish, Hamish Hamilton 2006 (ISBN 978-0241143308)
- Out of the Blue, Hamish Hamilton 2008 (ISBN 978-0241143629)
- Night Walk, Collins 2012 (ISBN 978-0007415540)
- The Lost Diary, Unbound 2013 (ISBN 978-1783520435)
- ’Lifelines-An Anthology of Angling Anecdotes, and More…‘’ NAROD Publishing, 2021. A collection of 27 short stories centred around angling by 27 different authors including 16.6 by Chris Yates.
