= Manchester Village Historic District =

Manchester Village Historic District may refer to:

- Manchester Village Historic District (Manchester, Massachusetts), listed on the NRHP in Massachusetts
- Manchester Village Historic District (Manchester, Vermont), listed on the NRHP in Vermont
