= Manchester Village =

Manchester Village may refer to:

- Manchester Village Historic District (Manchester, Massachusetts), historic area in United States
- Manchester Village Historic District (Manchester, Vermont), historic area in United States
- Manchester Village Spartans RUFC, English gay rugby union team
- Manchester (village), Vermont, village within town of Manchester, Vermont, United States
- Manchester (village), New York, village within town of Manchester, New York, United States

== See also ==
- Manchester gay village, area of Manchester, England
