= Brian Alexander =

Brian Alexander may refer to:

- Bryan Alexander (futurist) (born 1967), American researcher and writer
- Brian Alexander (water polo) (born 1983), American water polo player
- Brian R. Alexander, American journalist and author
- The Hon. Brian Alexander, heir presumptive to the Earl Alexander of Tunis
