= Brew Your Own =

American beer magazine

- Cover of the July–August 2024 issue
- Editor: Chris Colby
- Categories: homebrewing
- Frequency: 8 issues a year
- Publisher: Brad Ring
- Founded: 1995
- Company: Battenkill Communications
- Country: United States
- Based in: Manchester Village, Vermont
- Language: English
- Website: www.byo.com
- ISSN: 1081-826X

Brew Your Own is an American magazine, particularly concerned with the process of homebrewing beer. The magazine is published eight times annually from offices in Manchester Village, Vermont. Brew Your Own was launched in 1995 and is the largest circulation magazine for people interested in making their own beer at home. Subject matter covered in each issue includes beer recipes, how-to projects and advice columns.

Brew Your Own's sister publication is WineMaker magazine.
