= Early Winters (company) =

Camping equipment manufacturer founded in 1972

Early Winters, Ltd.
- Industry: Manufacturing
- Headquarters: Seattle, United States

Early Winters, Ltd. of Seattle, Washington, United States was founded in 1972 by William S. Nicolai, who formed the company after creating a tent called the Omnipotent. Early Winters was the first company to create and sell a consumer product made with Gore-Tex laminates produced by W. L. Gore & Associates in Elkton, Maryland. The first product made with Gore-Tex fabric debuted in 1976 and was a streamlined, two-person tent called The Light Dimension. The tent was created by Nicolai and William H. Edwards and was marketed by Ron Zimmerman.

In 1975, Gore salesman Joe Tanner introduced Early Winters to the fabric product, which at that time was still without a name. Over a two-year period, Tanner had made numerous sales calls and had been turned down by companies such as REI, Eddie Bauer, and The North Face. Early Winters was the first company to realize the significance of Gore-Tex fabrics for outdoor applications. In fact, the timing of Tanner's visit was fortuitous since Early Winters had a lightweight, single-walled tent design for which they were seeking a waterproof and breathable fabric solution.

When Tanner showed Early Winters the product sample, the Early Winters staff tried it out by using a rubber band to secure a sample of the fabric over a coffee cup filled with boiling water. This allowed visible steam to pass through the Gore-Tex fabric, but when the cup was turned over, no liquid was claimed to come through. This consumer demonstration became known at W.L. Gore & Associates as the "Z Square" test, named after Zimmerman. This "coffee cup" demonstration has become well known in the outdoor industry because it is an effective way to convey the concept of fabric that is waterproof, yet breathable.

After learning about the product, Nicolai, Edwards, and Zimmerman requested sample material for experimentation, and in Winter 1975, they produced a prototype tent that they subjected to testing in extreme outdoor conditions. After success with the prototype tent, Early Winters became the first commercial company to place an order for Gore-Tex fabric. Early Winters introduced The Light Dimension tent in May 1976. This tent, along with other items made with GORE-TEX fabric, debuted in the first official Early Winters catalogue.

Early Winters approached $20 million (USD) in annual sales, mostly through catalogs, before being sold to the Orvis company in 1984. It was later purchased by the Norm Thompson group in Portland, Oregon. In 2004, Norm Thompson renamed the company Sahalie who still sells Early Winters branded clothing.
