= Rosenbauer (surname) =

Rosenbauer is a German language occupational surname for a rose grower. Notable people with the name include:

- Stefan Rosenbauer (1896–1967), German fencer and photographer
- Tom Rosenbauer, fly fishing mentor and author
