= John Gierach =

American author and freelance writer (1946–2024)

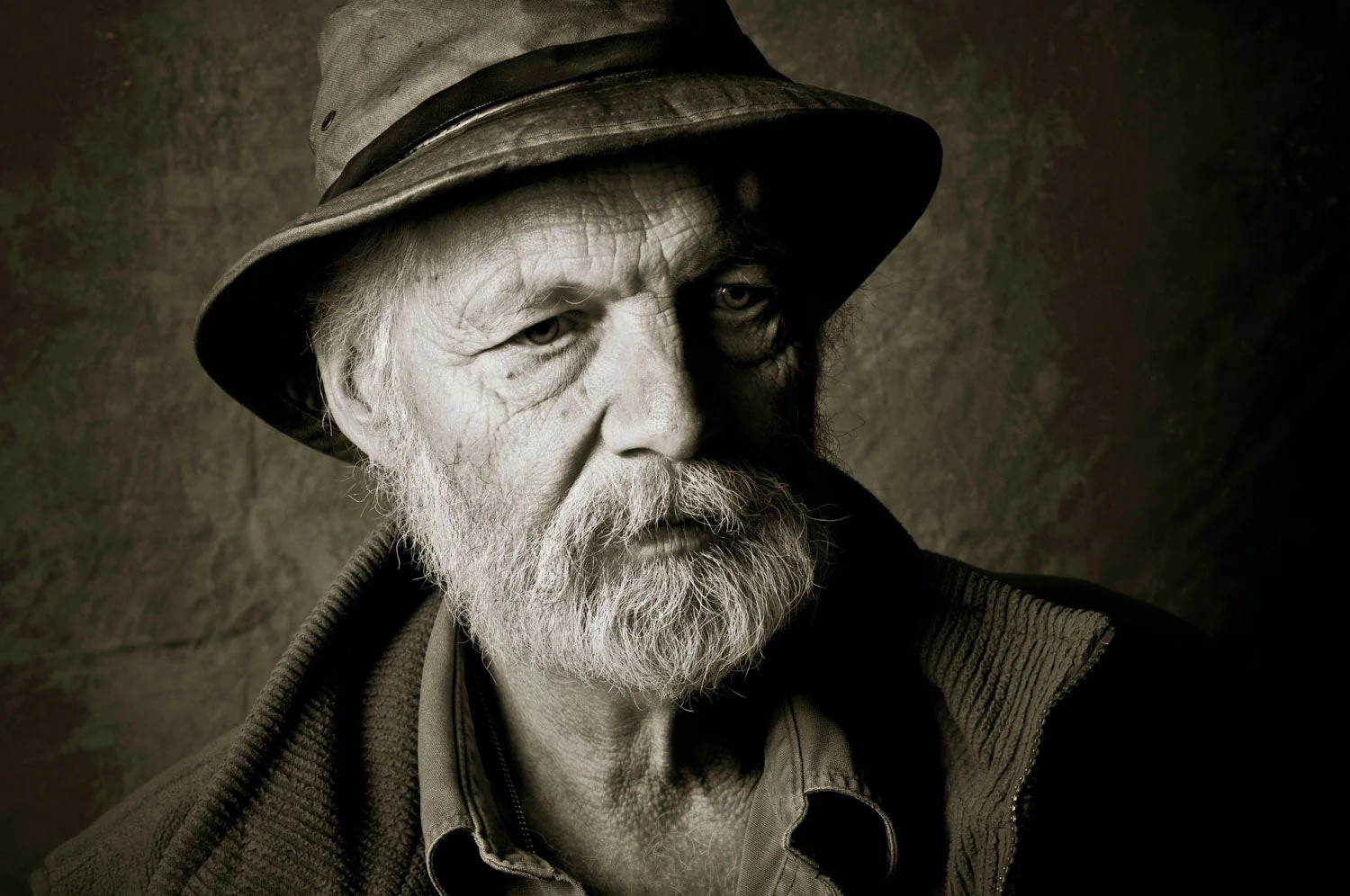
- Born: November 24, 1946; Chicago Heights, Illinois, U.S.
- Died: October 3, 2024 (aged 77); Longmont, Colorado, U.S.
- Education: Findlay College
- Occupation: Writer
- Writing career
- Language: English
- Genre: Narrative essays
- Subject: Fly-fishing
- Notable works: The View from Rat Lake; Even Brook Trout Get the Blues; Trout Bum
- Notable awards: Roderick Haig-Brown Award (US Federation of Fly Fishers)

John Lawrence Gierach (November 24, 1946 – October 3, 2024) was an American author and freelance writer who lived in Larimer County, near Lyons, Colorado.

== Biography ==
Gierach was born in Chicago Heights, Illinois, on November 24, 1946, and grew up in a suburb of Minneapolis-Saint Paul. He graduated from the University of Findlay in Ohio, then known as Findlay College, having majored in philosophy and minored in English. In 1969, he moved to Lyons, Colorado, where he worked at a silver mine and fished regularly. He began writing more regularly at this time.

His books are based on his fly fishing excursions all over the world, many of which were undertaken alongside his friend A.K. Best. His book Trout Bum popularized the term "trout bum." Gierach also wrote poetry and authored two books of poems.

Gierach's archival collection is kept at Montana State University, alongside an oral history collected by MSU about Gierach's life as an angler and an angling writer. The collection includes his manuscripts, poetry, photographs, fishing logs, and general correspondence from 1976 to 2014. A correspondence of interest included in the collection is between Gierach and his close friend Ed Engle. This collection is open for research.

Gierach died from a heart attack on October 3, 2024, in Longmont, Colorado, at the age of 77.

== Writing career ==
Gierach began writing professionally because he needed money. Starting out, he wrote contributory notes and features for the Fly Fisherman to pay his monthly rent. Prior to selling his work, Gierach had been writing consistently and felt that he could write as well as the angling authors who were getting published at the time.

His work has appeared in Gray's Sporting Journal, Field & Stream, where he was a contributing author, and Fly, Rod, and Reel, where he was an editor at large. In the 1990s, he wrote a column for the "Outdoors" section of The New York Times. Gierach also wrote columns for the Longmont Daily Times-Call, the monthly Redstone Review, and the quarterly publication TROUT for the non-profit Trout Unlimited. These articles pertained mostly to the sport of fly fishing, but Gierach's perspective on nature, philosophy, and life was also central to his work. The New York Times also featured several of Gierach's books in a "Books of the Times" article.

A.K. Best, a close friend of Gierach's, is included in many of the articles due to their relationship built around fly fishing. Best previously owned a fly shop in Colorado where he tied flies at a production level (tying many identical flies for international vendors). He worked for the Orvis Company, creating fly tying tools and advertising flies, and was a signature tyer for Umpqua Feather Merchants. Gierach encouraged Best to start writing about production fly tying and fly fishing as a whole.

After making a name for himself in angling magazines, Gierach's work garnered attention from Sports Illustrated and The Wall Street Journal, with the latter calling him "the voice of the common angler". He is one of the only angling authors to be published by a premier publishing house.

== Recognitions ==
Gierach was the 1994 recipient of the US Federation of Fly Fishers Roderick Haig-Brown Award. The award recognizes a fly fishing author whose work embodies the philosophy and spirit of Roderick Haig-Brown, particularly a respect for the ethics and traditions of fly fishing and an understanding of rivers, the inhabitants, and their environments. Gierach's interest and knowledge of the natural world are detailed in his publications, though he considered himself an "amateur" naturalist.

In 2015, he was inducted into the Catskills Fly Fishing Hall of Fame. The criteria include, amongst other traits, that the inductee has made "significant contributions to the sport" by furthering aquatic habitat understanding, innovating fly fishing techniques, or furthering appreciation and knowledge of the sport.

== Selected bibliography ==
=== Sole works ===
- Signs of Life (1977)
- Fly-fishing the High Country (1984)
- Trout Bum (1986)
- The View from Rat Lake (1988)
- Fly-fishing Small Streams (1989)
- Sex, Death, and Fly-Fishing (1990)
- Where the Trout Are All as Long as Your Leg (1991)
- Even Brook Trout Get the Blues (1992)
- Dances with Trout (1994)
- Another Lousy Day in Paradise (1996)
- Fishing Bamboo (1997)
- Standing in a River Waving a Stick (1999)
- Good Flies: Favorite Trout Patterns and How They Got That Way (2000)
- Death, Taxes, And Leaky Waders: A John Gierach Fly Fishing Treasury (2000)
- At the Grave of the Unknown Fisherman (2003)
- The Fly Fishing Anthology (2004, contributor with Mallory Burton, Ernest Hemingway, and others)
- Still Life with Brook Trout (2005)
- Fool's Paradise (2008)
- No Shortage of Good Days (2011)
- All Fishermen are Liars (2014)
- A Fly Rod of Your Own (2017)
- Dumb Luck and the Kindness of Strangers (2020)
- All the Time in the World (2023)

=== Gierach's introductions ===
- A. K. Best's Fly Box: How to Tie the Master Fly-Tyer's Patterns
- A. K. Best's Advanced Fly Tying: The Proven Methods and Techniques of a Master Professional Fly Tyer--37 Important Patterns
- Dyeing and Bleaching Natural Fly-Tying Materials
- Production Fly Tying − A Collection Of Ideas, Notions, Hints, & Variations On The Techniques Of Fly Tying
- The Classic Sporting Art of Bob White
