= The Chemistry Between Us =

The Chemistry Between Us may refer to:

- The Chemistry Between Us, book written by Larry J. Young and Brian Alexander
- The Chemistry Between Us, song by Suede
