= WineMaker Magazine =

American home winemaking magazine

WineMaker
- Cover of the August–September 2024 issue
- Editor: Chris Colby
- Categories: Home winemaking
- Frequency: 6 issues a year
- Publisher: Brad Ring
- Founded: 1999
- Company: Battenkill Communications
- Country: United States
- Based in: Manchester Village, Vermont
- Language: English
- Website: www.winemakermag.com

WineMaker Magazine is an American magazine, particularly concerned with the process of home winemaking. The magazine is published six times annually from offices in Manchester Village, Vermont. WineMaker was launched in 1999 and each issue includes wine recipes, how-to projects and advice columns. WineMaker magazine also runs the annual WineMaker International Amateur Wine Competition.

According to Tim Patterson in his book Home Winemaking For Dummies, "as hobby magazines go, this one is serious. It covers everything from kit wines to home vineyards and contains technically solid articles that get reviewed before they get published."

WineMaker’s sister publication is Brew Your Own magazine.
