= University of Findlay =

Private university in Findlay, Ohio, US

Coordinates: 41°3′18″N 83°39′18″W

- Former name: Findlay College (1882–1989)
- Motto: Scientia Libertas et Religio (Knowledge, Liberty, and Religion)
- Type: Private university
- Established: 1882; 144 years ago
- Religious affiliation: Churches of God General Conference (Winebrenner)
- Endowment: $53.6 million (2022)
- President: Richard L. Ludwick, J.D., Ed.D.
- Academic staff: 219 (full-time) and 152 (part-time) Spring 2022
- Students: 4,829 (spring 2022)
- Undergraduates: 3,732 (spring 2022)
- Postgraduates: 1,097 (spring 2022)
- Location: Findlay, Ohio, United States
- Campus: 76 acres (31 ha)
- Colors: Orange and Black
- Nickname: Oilers
- Sporting affiliations: NCAA Division II – G-MAC
- Mascot: Derrick the Oiler
- Website: findlay.edu

The University of Findlay is a private university in Findlay, Ohio, United States. It was established in 1882 through a joint partnership between the Churches of God General Conference and the city of Findlay. The University of Findlay has nearly 80 undergraduate programs leading to baccalaureate degrees and 11 master's degrees and five doctorate-level degree programs. Over 4,800 students are enrolled at Findlay. The University of Findlay has a 76-acre (31 ha) main campus and five off-campus facilities.

== History ==
The predecessor of the University of Findlay, Findlay College, was founded on January 28, 1882, by the city of Findlay and the Churches of God General Conference. By 1897, the college had established an endowment of more than $100,000 and boasted sixteen faculty members. In 1989, Findlay College became known as the University of Findlay. The campus, still affiliated with the Church of God, embarked on a building campaign, adding five new buildings over the next several years.

By the start of the twenty-first century, the institution boasted sixty-five different areas of undergraduate study and eight graduate programs. The university is especially well known for its equestrian studies program and offers equestrian riding as a varsity sport. In 2012, the university added structures to Davis Street to host its newly created pharmacy program.

In March 2024, the university and the nearby Bluffton University announced a merger, to be complete in fall 2025. The university called off the merger in February 2025.

== Academics ==
The University of Findlay is accredited by the Higher Learning Commission and the national accrediting organizations for athletic training, business, environmental health science and protection, intensive English language, nuclear medicine technology, nursing, occupational therapy, pharmacy, physical therapy, physician assistant, social work, strength and conditioning, and teacher education, teaching English to speakers of other languages.

The University of Findlay established the nation's first bachelor's degree in hazardous waste studies, now known as environmental, safety and occupational health management. The All Hazards Training Center, which grew from that initial program, has provided hands-on training simulations to more than 100,000 people from a wide range of backgrounds, including industry leaders and government officials involved in emergency planning, response and recovery.

The Nuclear Medicine Institute is a one-year professional program that trains nuclear medicine technologists. It was established in 1966 in Cleveland, Ohio, and moved to the campus of Findlay College in 1984. It is accredited by the Joint Review Committee on Educational Programs in Nuclear Medicine.

The English equestrian program utilizes a 72-acre (29 ha) farm, named the James L. Child Jr. Equestrian Complex after the late university trustee, houses the English equestrian studies program. Established in 1992, the program has won an Intercollegiate Horse Show Association national title, several reserve championships and numerous individual honors. It also includes University Equine Veterinary Services Inc. and an adjacent, 30-acre nature preserve.

Founded in 1976, the western equestrian program shares a 152-acre farm, the Animal Sciences Center, with the animal science/pre-veterinary medicine program. The western program has earned five Intercollegiate Horse Show Association national championships in the past decade as well as numerous individual honors.

=== Reputation and rankings ===
In the 2025 U.S. News & World Report college rankings, the University of Findlay was ranked 359th (tied) among 436 national universities.

=== Mazza Museum ===
The campus includes the Mazza Museum of International Art from Picture Books which contains the largest collection of children's book illustrations in the United States. Its collection numbers more than 11,000 pieces from authors and artists. Its mission is to promote literacy through its educational programs and to collect, exhibit and preserve original art from children's books.

== Student life ==
There are nearly 100 student organizations, including special interest clubs, student media, student government, performing arts groups, service clubs, academic honorary organizations, spiritual life groups, Greek sororities and fraternities, club sports, and 25 intramural sports. The school also holds a variety of theater productions, art exhibits, and vocal and instrumental music concerts.

== Campus ==
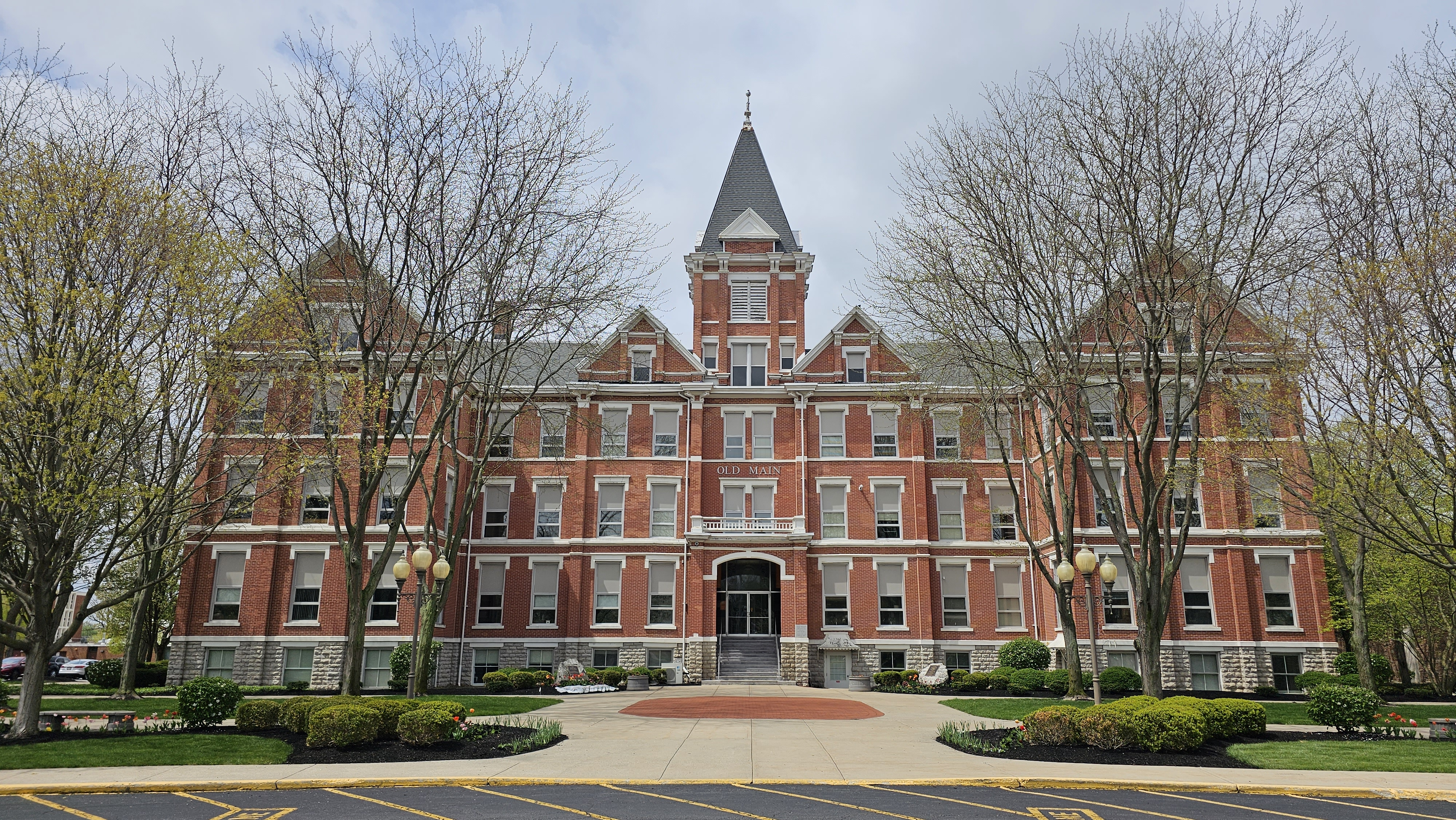
Old Main

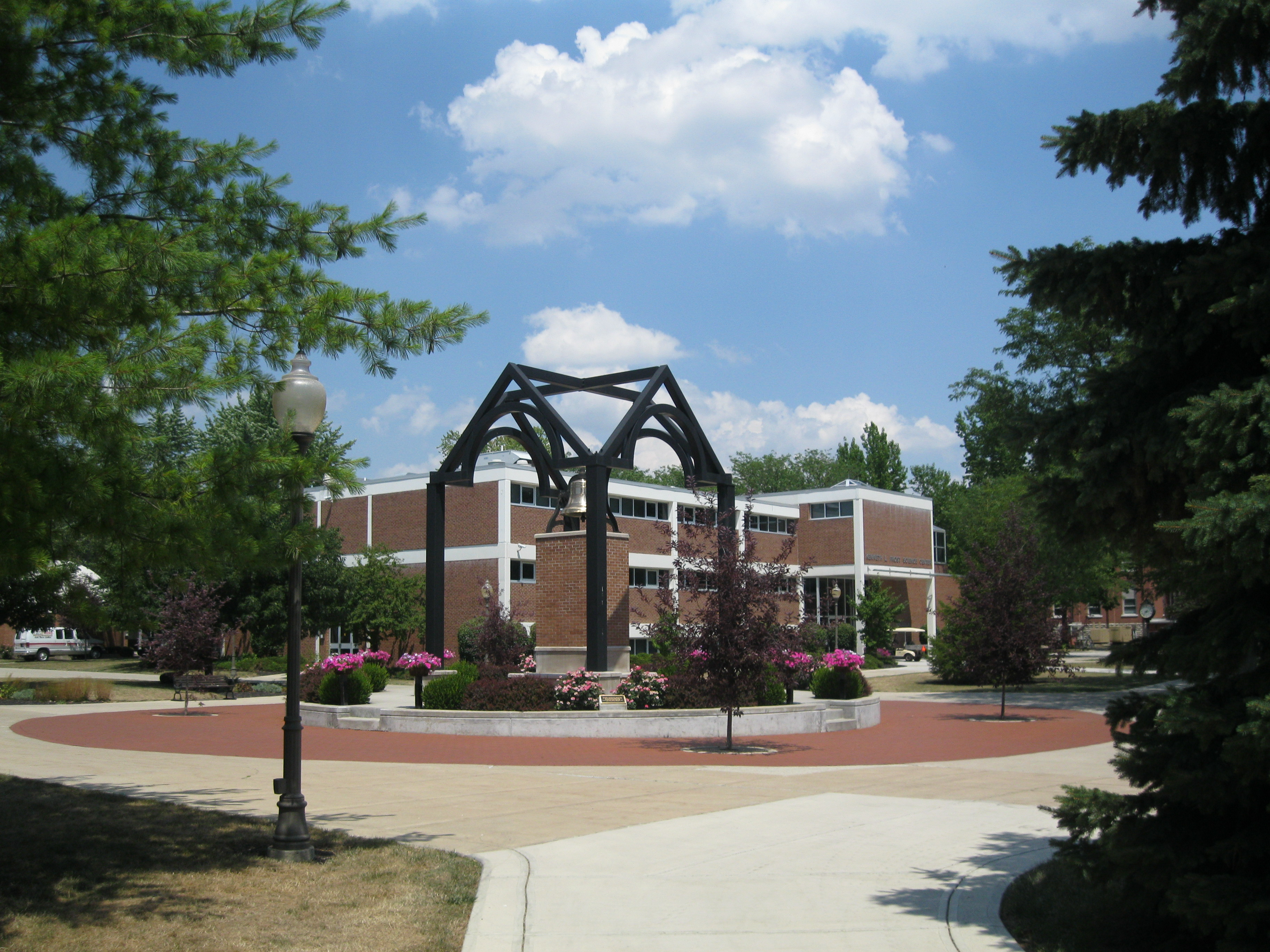
Science center

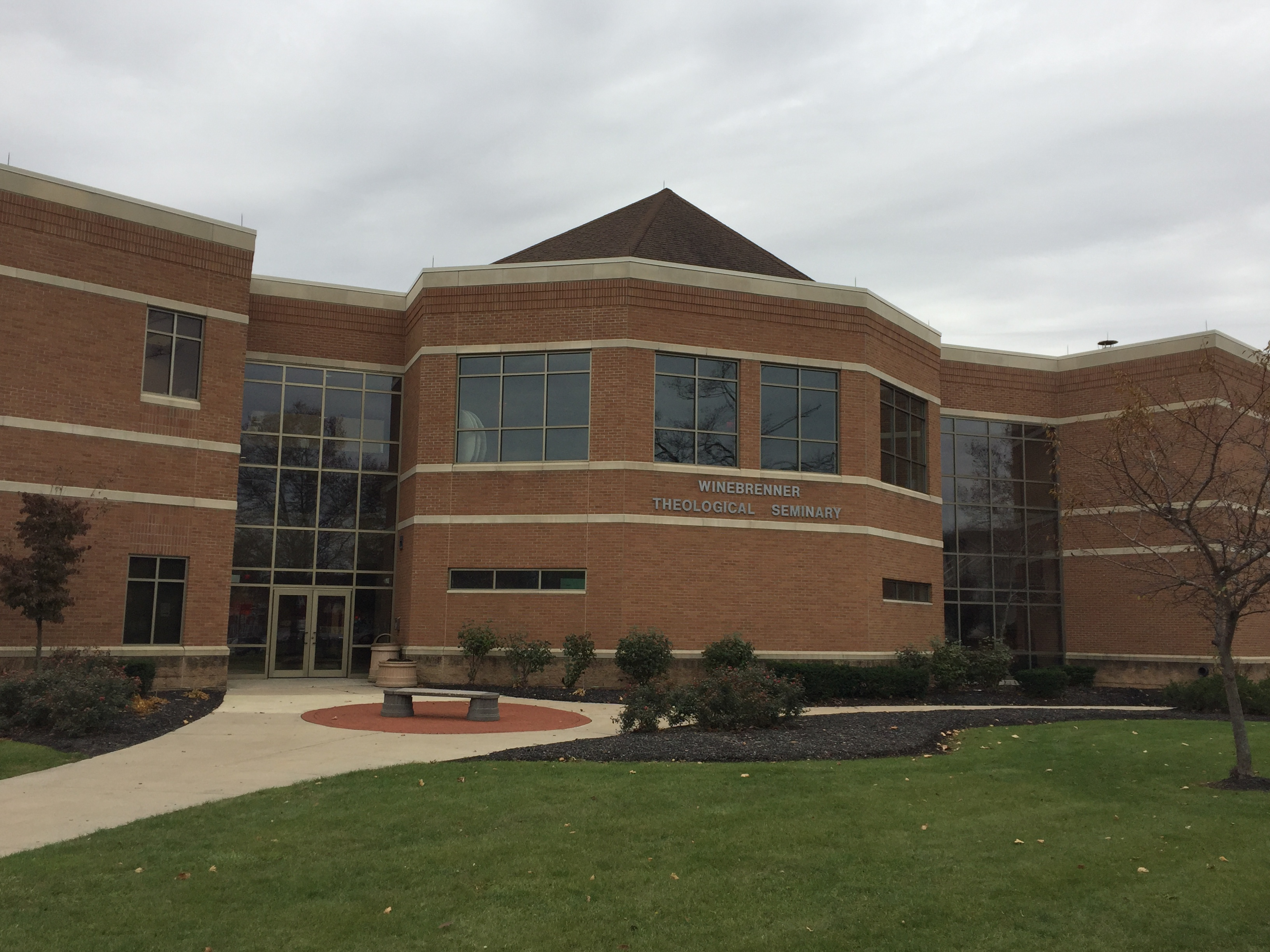
Theological Seminary

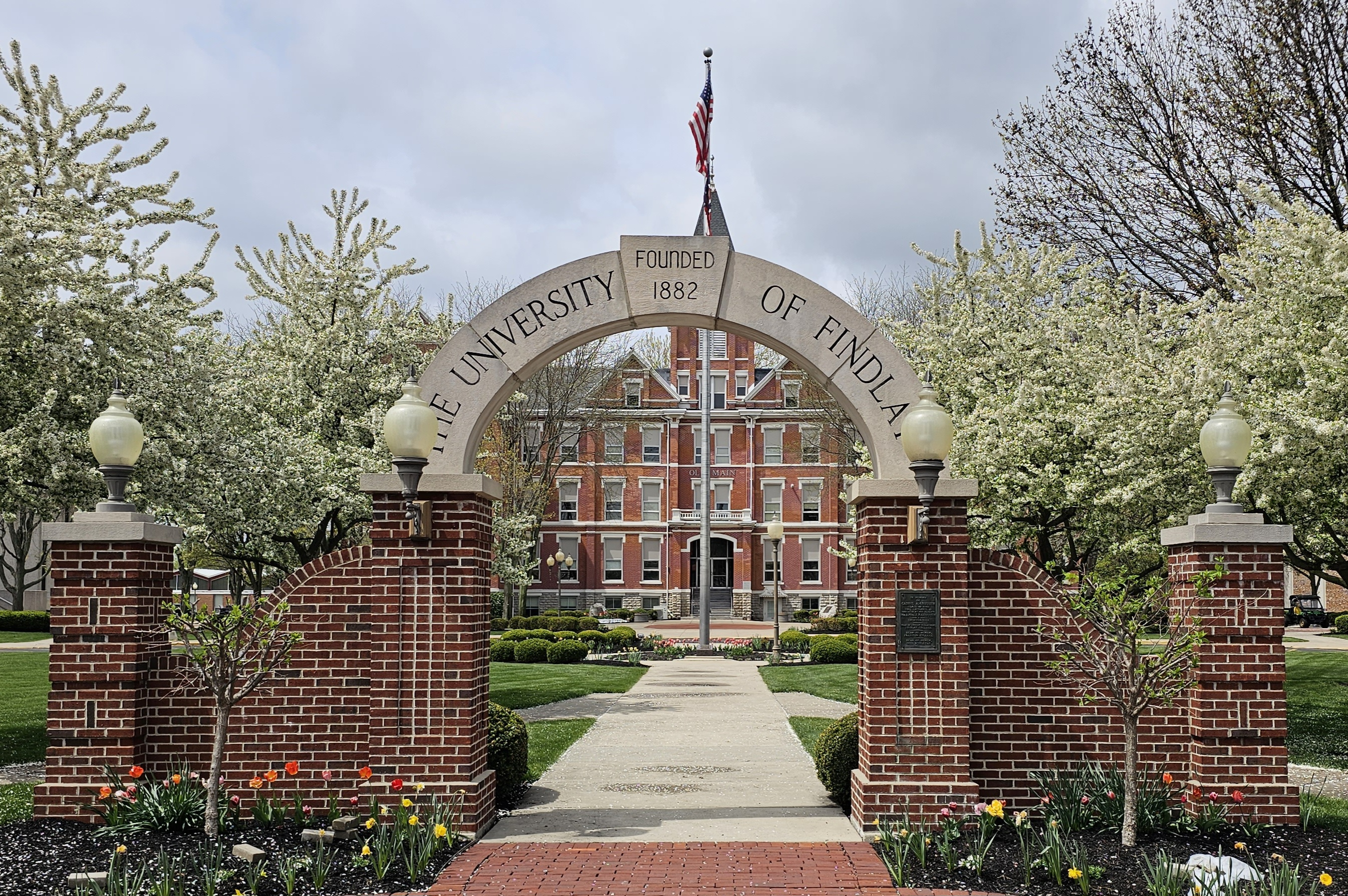
Entrance arch

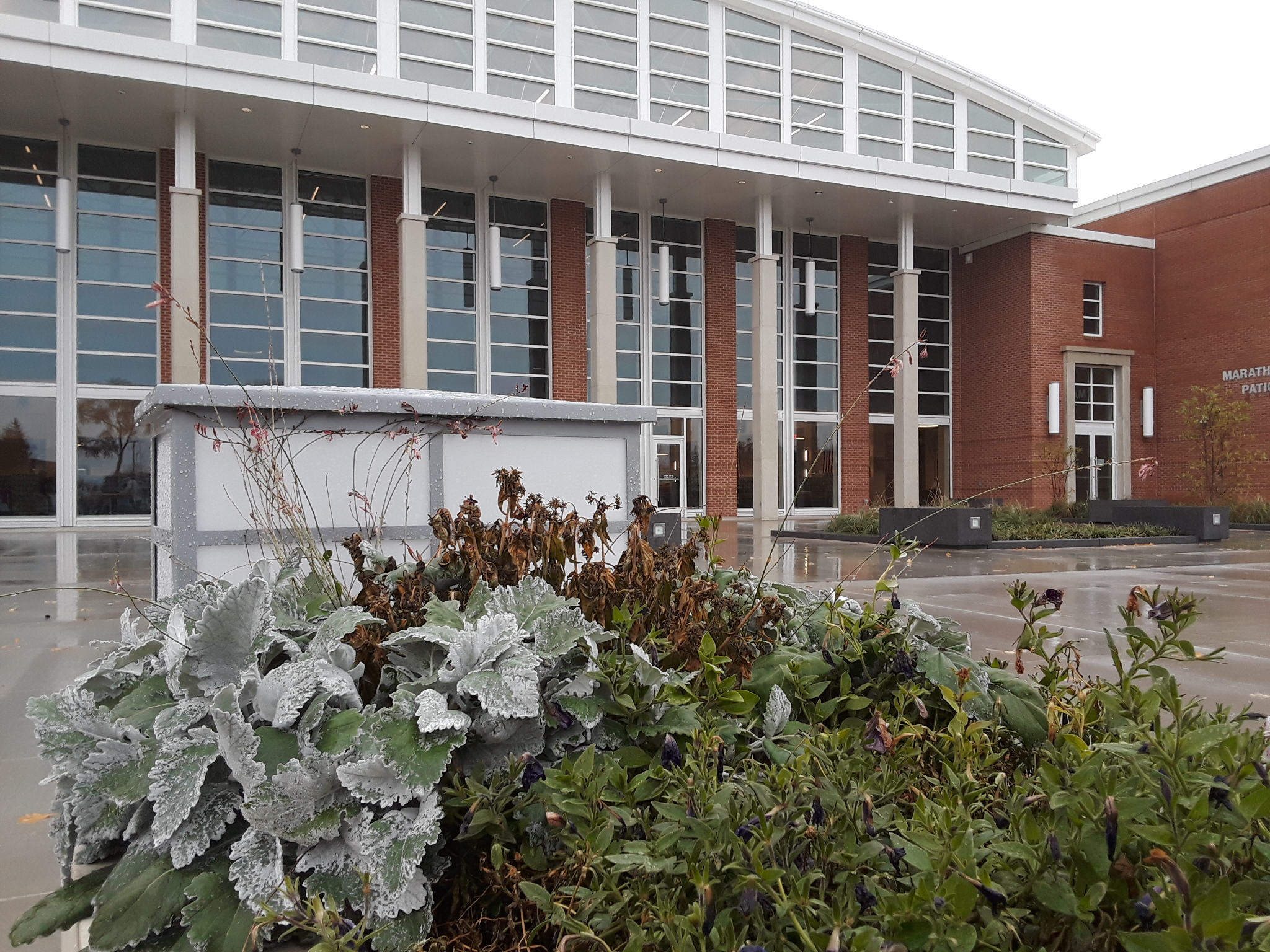
College of Business

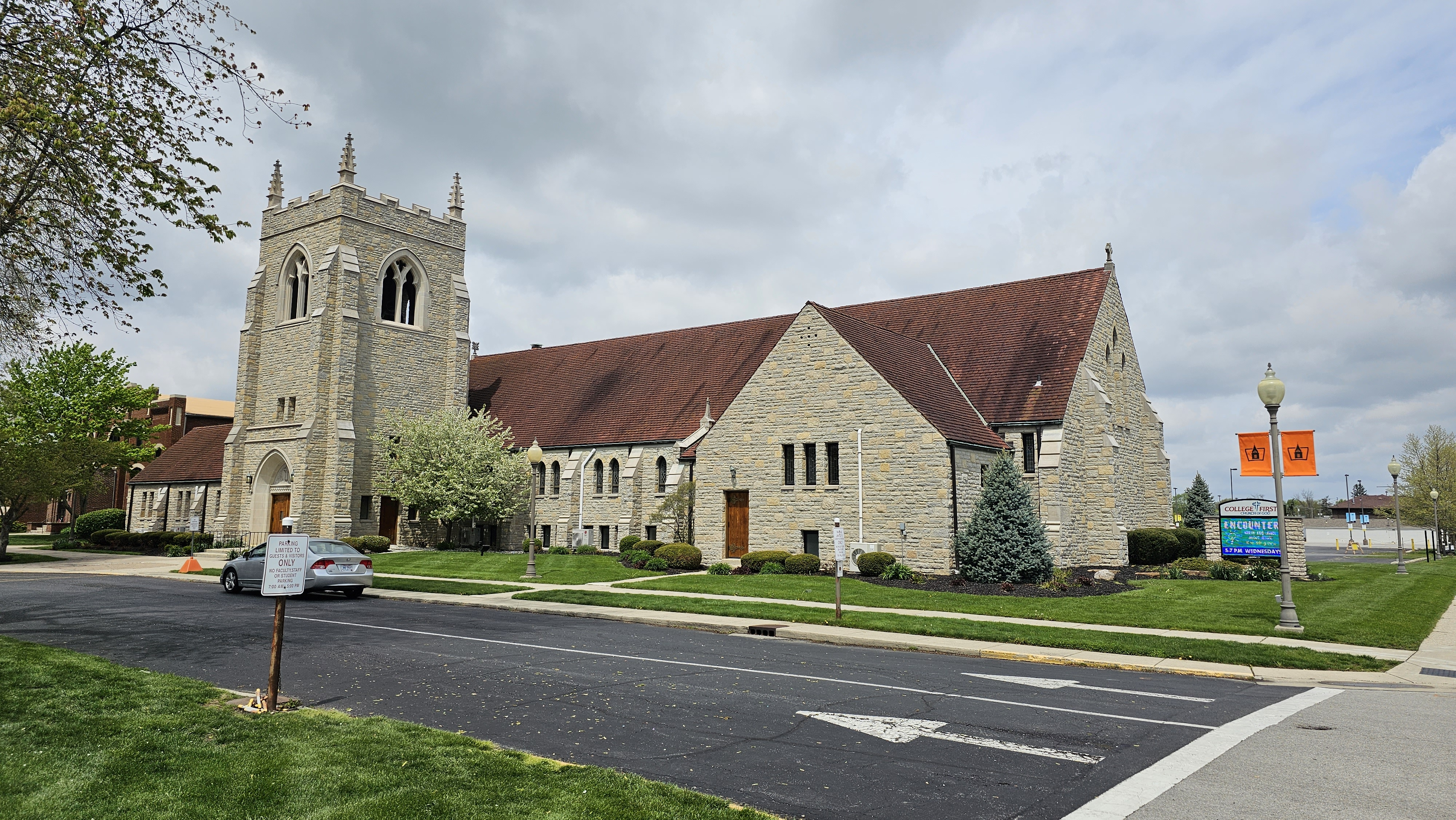
First Church of God

== Athletics ==
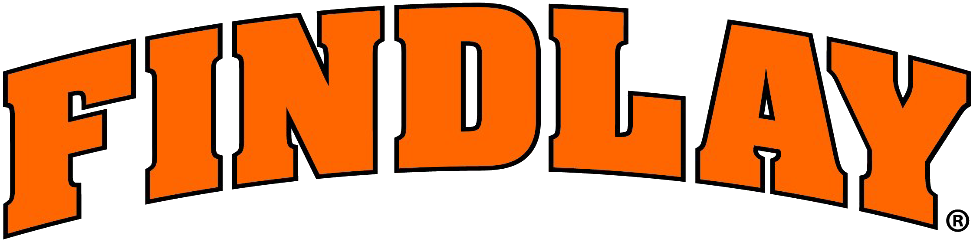
Findlay athletics wordmark

The University of Findlay, known athletically as the Oilers with their mascot named Derrick the Oiler, compete as a member of the Great Midwest Athletic Conference (G-MAC) of the National Collegiate Athletic Association (NCAA)'s Division II. Its student-athletes participate in 23 intercollegiate sports: men's sports include baseball, basketball, cross country, Western equestrian, English equestrian, football, golf, soccer, swimming & diving, tennis, track & field, wrestling; while women's sports include basketball, cheerleading, cross country, dance team, Western equestrian, English equestrian, golf, lacrosse, soccer, softball, swimming and diving, tennis, track & field and volleyball. The newest varsity sports are western and English equestrian riding, which are mixed sports, although they have predominantly female participants. Both equestrian teams are members of the Intercollegiate Horse Show Association.

== Notable alumni ==
- Brian Alexander, logistician
- Tim Beckman, college football
- Josh Bostic, college basketball player
- R. Clint Cole, U.S. Representative
- Ralph D. Cole, U.S. Representative
- Joanie Dodds, American fashion model
- Edward L. Feightner, World War II flying ace, test pilot, and Blue Angels pilot
- John Gierach, American fly fishing writer
- John W. Grabiel, Arkansas politician
- Tennyson Guyer, U.S. Representative
- Michael Jerrell, professional football player
- Vic Joseph, ringside commentator for World Wrestling Entertainment
- Harold Jones-Quartey, professional football player
- Waylon Lowe, college wrestler and mixed martial arts fighter
- Charlie Parker, professional basketball coach
- Stacy Westfall, professional horse trainer
- Bob Wortman, college and professional basketball official
