= Brian R. Alexander =

American journalist and author

Brian R. Alexander is an American journalist and author.

== Early life and education ==
Alexander was born on June 15,1959, and grew up in Lancaster, Ohio.

== Awards and honors ==
Brian R. Alexander
- Born: 15 June 1959 (age 67)
- Occupations: Journalist, author
- Writing career
- Subject: non-fiction
- Notable work: Glass House (2017) The Hospital (2021) The Mayor (2026)
- Notable awards: Ohioana Book Award for Non-fiction 2018 'Glass House'; Ohioana Book Award for Non-fiction 2022 'Hospital'

In 2007, Alexander was nominated for the John Bartlow Martin Award for public interest journalism of the Medill School of Journalism of Northwestern University. In 2018, he won the Ohioana Book Award for non-fiction for Glass House, in 2022 he won the same award for Hospital.

== Books ==
- The Mayor: One Poor City’s Fight to Bring Back Government and Save the Nation's Soul (2026)
- The Hospital: Life, Death, and Dollars in a Small American Town (St. Martins Press, 2021)
- Glass House The 1% Economy and the Shattering of the All-American Town (St. Martin's Press, 2017)
- with Larry Young The Chemistry Between Us: Love, Sex, and the Science of Attraction (Current, 2012)
- America Unzipped: In Search of Sex and Satisfaction (Crown Publishing, 2008)
- Rapture: A Raucous Tour Of Cloning, Transhumanism, And And The New Era Of Immortality (Basic Books, 2004)
- Green Cathedrals: A Wayward Traveler in the Rain Forest (Lyons Press, 1995)
