= Equinox House Historic District =

Historic district in Vermont, United States

- U.S. National Register of Historic Places
- U.S. Historic district
- U.S. Historic district – Contributing property
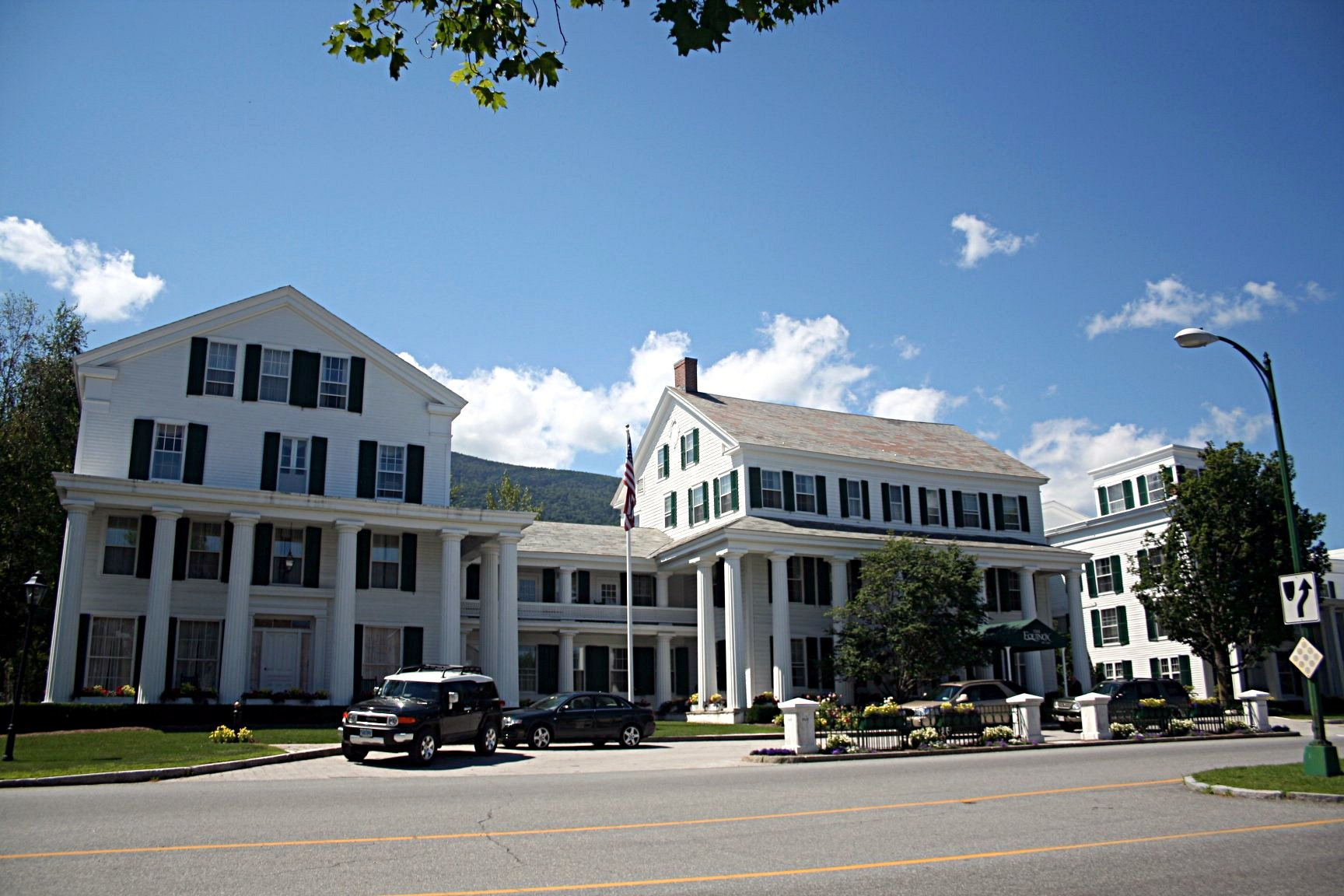
- The Equinox House hotel

- Location within Vermont Location within the United States
- Location: Main and Union Sts., Manchester, Vermont
- Coordinates: 43°9′43″N 73°4′25″W
- Area: 25.8 acres (10.4 ha)
- Architectural style: Greek Revival, Italianate
- Part of: Manchester Village Historic District (ID84003438)
- NRHP reference No.: 72000107 (original); 80000384 (increase)

Significant dates
- Added to NRHP: November 21, 1972
- Boundary increase: June 3, 1980
- Designated CP: January 26, 1984

The Equinox House Historic District encompasses the historic center of the village of Manchester, Vermont. It includes a small group of civic and commercial buildings around the junction of Main Street (Vermont Route 7A) and Union Street, with the luxury Equinox House hotel as its primary focus. The district, developed as a tourist destination in the late 1800s, was listed on the National Register of Historic Places in 1972, and enlarged in 1980. It is a small portion of the Manchester Village Historic District.

== Description and history ==
Manchester is a town in northern Bennington County, Vermont, with its village center on the east side of Equinox Mountain. The heart of the village is at the junction of Vermont 7A, formerly the major north–south route through the area, and Union Street, which extends east toward the Battenkill River. The area has long been known for the spa waters that came down from the mountain, and has since the mid-19th century been a tourist destination. The Equinox Hotel, one of Vermont's few surviving 19th-century grand hotels, anchors the west side of the village, and has catered to many prominent visitors over its long history. Prominent guests included Mary Todd Lincoln and her son Robert, who later built the Hildene estate to the south, and Ulysses S. Grant.

Across Main Street from the hotel, facing either Main Street or Union Street, are a number of civic and commercial buildings, all built before 1872. Notable among these are the First Congregation Church, built in 1871 and the town's tallest building, and the Bennington County Courthouse (1822). Of commercial note is the Orvis Building, where in 1856 Charles Orvis founded the eponymous company that dominates the fly-fishing market. A number of the buildings in the center are associated with the Orvises, who were an economically significant force in the town for many years.

The Equinox Hotel was listed on the National Register in 1972. In 1980 the listing was enlarged to include the other buildings; all of these are also contributing elements to the Manchester Village Historic District.

== See also ==
- National Register of Historic Places listings in Bennington County, Vermont
