= The Hospital: Life, Death, and Dollars in a Small American Town =

2021 book by Brian R. Alexander

The Hospital: Life, Death, and Dollars in a Small American Town is a 2021 non-fiction book by journalist Brian R. Alexander. It was written over two years as he embedded himself in the Community Hospitals and Wellness Centers in the town of Bryan in northwest Ohio and documented how the struggling independent community hospital functioned and the residents of the town navigated the healthcare system.
