= A. K. Best =

American fly fisherman, tyer and author (1933–2025)

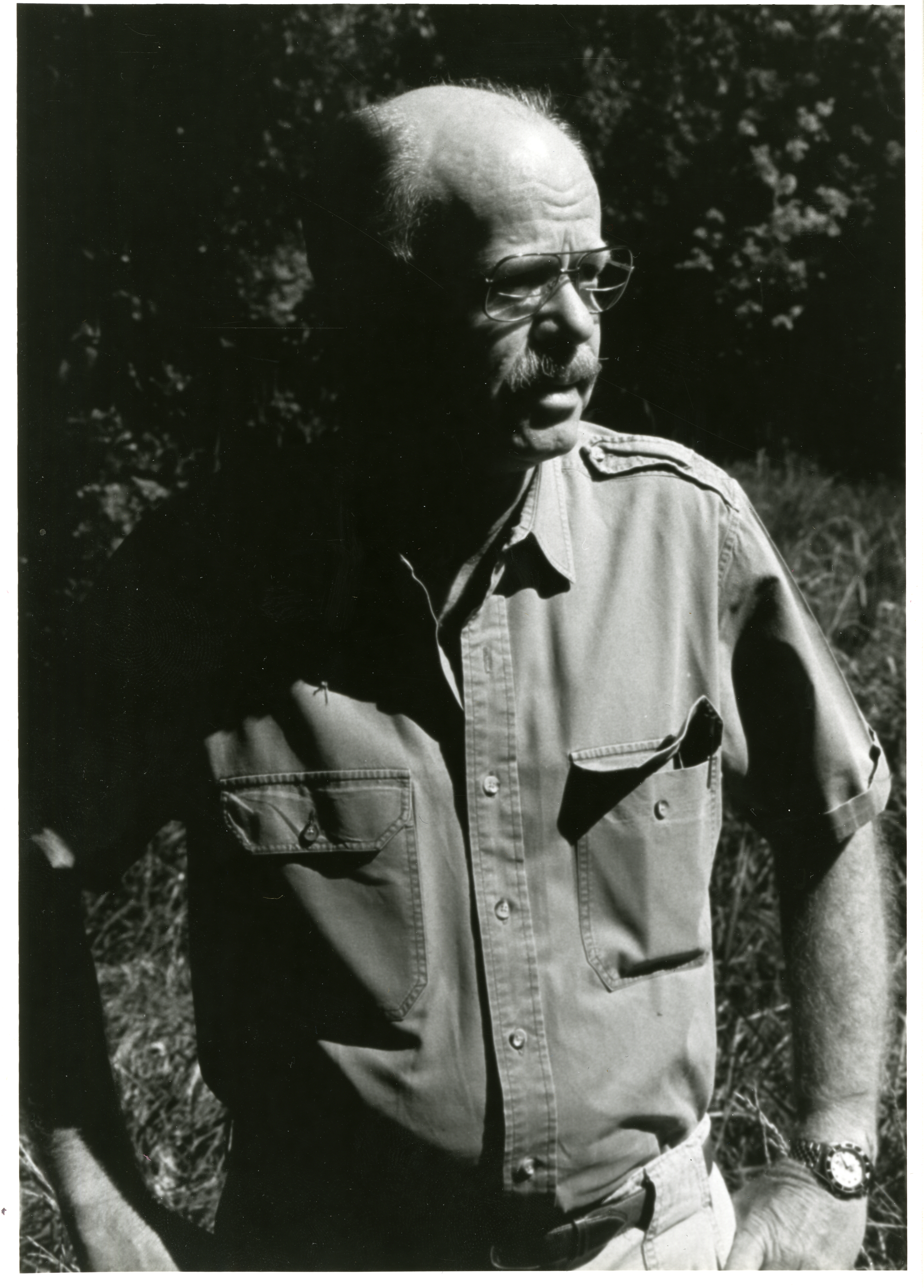
- Born: Archie Kenneth Best; February 26, 1933; Glidden, Iowa, U.S.
- Died: August 20, 2025 (aged 92); Boulder, Colorado, U.S.
- Occupations: Author, professional fly tyer, and fly fisher
- Years active: 1960–2025
- Known for: Writing books about fly tying and fly fishing.

Archie Kenneth Best (February 26, 1933 – August 20, 2025) was an American production fly tyer, fly fisher, and angling writer. He was born in 1933 in Iowa and lived in Colorado until his death in 2025. He wrote for angling magazines like Fly Rod and Reel, Fly Fisherman, and Mid-Atlantic Fly Fishing Guide, and published several books on fly tying and fishing. His flies were sold in stores nationwide, as well as from online vendors. Best traveled to speak about fly tying at angling clubs nationwide.

Before he started writing, Best played the saxophone with a small band. Jazz musician Woody Herman invited Best to play with his big band, but Best had just been drafted into the U.S. Army and couldn't join. After serving, Best attended Drake University for a Master's degree in music education. He then spent 17 years working in the Alpena County music department. In Michigan is where he "discovered brook trout, which changed my life." As he couldn't afford to buy flies, he learned to make them.

Best's fly tying books detail materials, methods, and techniques for creating flies. These works include Production Fly Tying, A.K.'s Fly Box, and Advanced Fly Tying. Best also produced a collection of videos that range from 50 to 120 minutes long and detail "efficient and practical methods" for fly tying. His flies were contracted by large firms like the Orvis Company, the Urban Angler shop in Manhattan, and international supplier Umpqua Feather Merchants from Colorado. Best's dry flies were also sold nationwide by the thousands.

A close friend of American author and fly fisher John Gierach, Best has appeared in several of Gierach's stories and many of his newspaper articles, sometimes being referred to as "Dryflyguru." The nickname comes from Best's affinity for using dry flies while fishing. The fly fishers met while working at a fly shop in Colorado and began fishing together on their days off. Gierach encouraged Best to start writing and wrote several of the introductions to his books.

Best's manuscript materials, published articles, memorabilia, flies, and business correspondence ranging from 1983 to 2015 can be found in the Montana State University Archives and Special Collections. There is also an interview with Best included in the collection regarding his life as a fly fisher and fly tyer, as a part of the Angling Oral History Project.

Best died from an aortic aneurysm in Boulder, Colorado, on August 20, 2025, at the age of 92.

== Work with the Orvis Company ==
Best spent much time developing flies and fly tying tools with the Orvis company. He was a custom contract tyer for the company. The work included writing testimonials and articles on his flies, and designing a vise used to hold flies in the creation process, as well as other fly tying tools. Best's testimonials for the Orvis fly tying catalogues show his support for the company's goods. Additionally, Best wrote several articles on specific fly patterns regarding the process of designing the flies and best practice uses. These articles were placed near an advert for the flies, which could be bought from Orvis. Correspondence from Orvis fly buyers and Best note that these articles helped sell more flies. The Orvis Company continues to reference Best's fly tying methods in instructional videos.

== Fly tying career ==
Eleven flies tied by Best, from his collection at the Montana State University Archives and Special Collections.

Best started selling flies to shops in the early sixties when he lived in Michigan. He made several display cases of his flies and would take them with him every time he went trout fishing. Along the way, he'd stop at gas stations or fly shops to see if they were running low on any patterns. He wrote in a document given to the MSU Archives and Special Collections, "If they were I would go back to my car and bring in the display cases and tell the owner that I noticed they were out of size 16 Adams (for example) and ask if they would like to place an order. It worked nearly every time and I garnered several regular accounts."

Best opened his fly shop, A.K.'s Fly Shop, in 1972 after spending 25 years working as a teacher and owning a fly tackle shop. At this time, his shop tied 72,000 flies per year. By the time Best wrote his first book in 1989, he had already been tying flies for 25 years, professionally for ten. Around this time, a fly fishing shop opened in Manhattan, N.Y., called the Urban Angler, and Best is attributed with tying nearly all of the dry flies the shop sold.

Best became a regular columnist for the magazine Mid-Atlantic Fly Fishing Guide in 1995. His monthly column "From the Vise" gave detailed instructions for creating a specific fly. One of Best's most used strategies for creating fly patterns is to stare at the water and watch insects float by. By looking at the water, a fisher can spot hatching or currently populous insects to determine what fly to use. Best is known for chasing and catching bugs to "agonize over their exact size and color." He also regularly carries a camera and notebook with him while fishing to record insects. Best noticed that the same kind of insect in different areas have slight color variation that many anglers ignore. When tying a certain type of fly, he will adjust the color according to where he wants to use it. The method, while not foolproof, helps Best tie flies in a more detailed and logical way. Gierach writes of this method for fly improvement, that Best creates "a new pattern that may ... fool a few more trout."

Best's unique patterns garnered interest from all over the world. Interviews with him appear in international fly fishing magazines such as Flugfiske i Norden (based in Sweden) and Tight Loop (based in Japan). Even when not production tying, Best tied over 6,500 flies each year. When he was a production fly tyer (as in, producing many identical flies to sell to shops), he estimated tying over 30,000 flies per season, and could tie as many as 40 flies in an hour. Umpqua Feather Merchants and the Orvis Company continue to use Best's patterns and reference his work.

== Publications ==
- Production Fly Tying (1989)
- Dying and Bleaching Natural Fly Tying Materials (1993)
- A.K.'s Fly Box (1996)
- The Best Flies of A.K. Best (1999)
- Advanced Fly Tying (2001)
- Dying and Bleaching Natural Fly Tying Materials (second edition) (2004)
- Fly Fishing with A.K. (2005)
- Fly Tying with A.K. (2008)
