= Trout bum =

Nickname for a trout angler

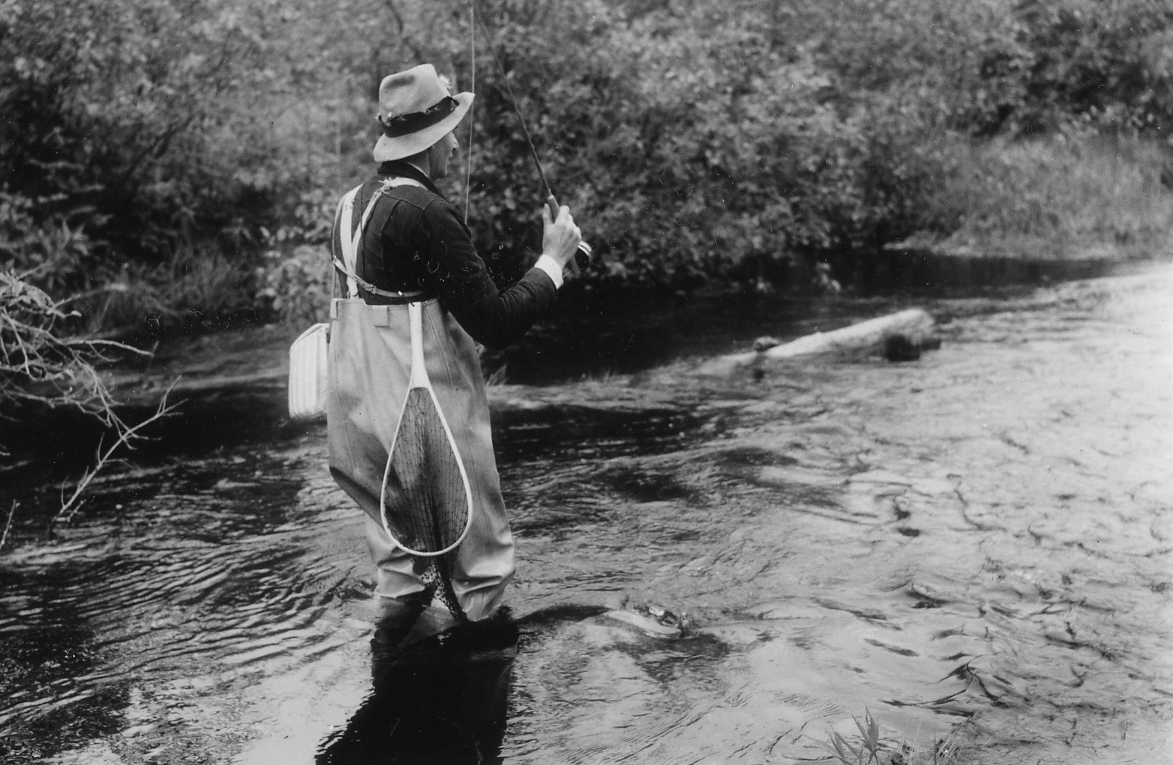
Mile Howell of Rochester

Trout bum is an affectionate nickname for dedicated trout anglers, particularly those who practice fly fishing. Use of the term is similar in tone and meaning to the antiquated term, "Surf bum". The term was popularized by author John Gierach, whose early work, Trout Bum is an anthology of informal, narrative essays on fly fishing; and magazine articles he wrote before 1986.

== Background ==
Fly Rod and Reel Magazine hosts an annual "trout bum" tournament dedicated to the pursuit of as many trout species as a two-man team of anglers can catch on a budget of only $500.
