= Tom Rosenbauer =

Fly fisherman, author

Tom Rosenbauer is a fly fishing mentor and author. He lives and works near Manchester, Vermont. He has published books for Orvis and has been associated with them for over 30 years. He is also the host of the Orvis Fly Fishing Guide Podcast which has been syndicated online since April 2008.

== Selected works ==
- The Orvis Guide to Small Stream Fly Fishing (October 2011)
- The Orvis Guide to Prospecting for Trout: How to Catch Fish When There's No Hatch to Match, Revised Edition
- The Orvis Fly-Fishing Guide, Completely Revised and Updated with Over 400 New Color Photos and Illustrations
- The Orvis Guide To Reading Trout Streams
- The Orvis Fly-Tying Guide (winner of the 2001 National Outdoor Book Award (instructional))
- The Orvis Guide to Beginning Fly Fishing: 101 Tips for the Absolute Beginner
- Casting Illusions: The World of Fly-Fishing
- Fly Fishing In America
- The Orvis Fly-Fishing Guide Podcast (2008-present)
