= Norm Thompson Outfitters =

American catalog retailer

- Company type: Private
- Industry: Mail order, retail
- Founded: 1949; 77 years ago
- Headquarters: Middleton, Massachusetts, U.S. 42°35′55″N 70°58′20″W
- Key people: Martin McClanan, president and CEO
- Products: clothing; gadgets; furniture; kitchen items; gift items
- Revenue: US$ 108.55 million
- Number of employees: 500
- Parent: Orchard Brands
- Website: www.normthompson.com

Norm Thompson Outfitters was a privately owned catalog and internet retailer based in Middleton, Massachusetts that was previously based in Hillsboro, Oregon, United States until September 2016. The Norm Thompson offices were closed and consolidated due to Bluestem's acquisition of their parent company, Orchard Brands, in July 2015. Founded in 1949 by Norman A. (Norm) Thompson as a mail order business, it grew to annual sales of $200 million before it was sold to Golden Gate Capital Partners in 2006. The company sells clothing, gadgets, furniture, kitchen items, and gift items from its namesake catalog as well as from its Solutions and Sahalie brands. John Difrancesco serves as president and chief executive of the 500 employee company.

== History ==
The company was founded by namesake Norman Anchor Thompson, Sr. in 1949 as a way to sell his homemade flies for fly-fishing. An immigrant from Britain, he had settled in Salt Lake City before fighting for Canada in World War I. After the war he lived briefly in Los Angeles before settling in Portland where he owned seven pipe shops and later two nightclubs during World War II. Thompson retired after the war as owner of the nightclubs and tobacco shops.

He started the new business as a mail order only business by placing an advertisement in Field & Stream, and around 1951 handed it over to Peter Alport, his son-in-law. Alport was in advertising in New York City where he owned Parma Advertising. He worked to expand the company's product offerings beyond fly-fishing items and into clothing and other outdoor merchandise, plus he developed the company's slogan of Escape from the ordinary. During his tenure, Norm Thompson opened its first retail store in 1959, located in Northwest Portland. Namesake Norm Thompson died in 1968 from complications related to his exposure to mustard gas during his World War I military service in Europe.

In 1973, Alport sold the business to Parker Pen Company, who opened a retail store at the Portland International Airport in 1975 and discontinued selling fly fishing items in 1977. Parker then sold the entire business to John Emrick in 1981 through a leveraged buyout. Solutions, a home and garden catalog, was created by Norm Thompson Outfitters in 1986, followed by the 1990 purchase of Early Winters which was later re-branded as Sahalie. About that time, they created a sleepwear and underwear catalog and named it The Primary Layer. In July 1988, the company opened an outlet store near the main store in Portland, naming it Cracker Barrel.

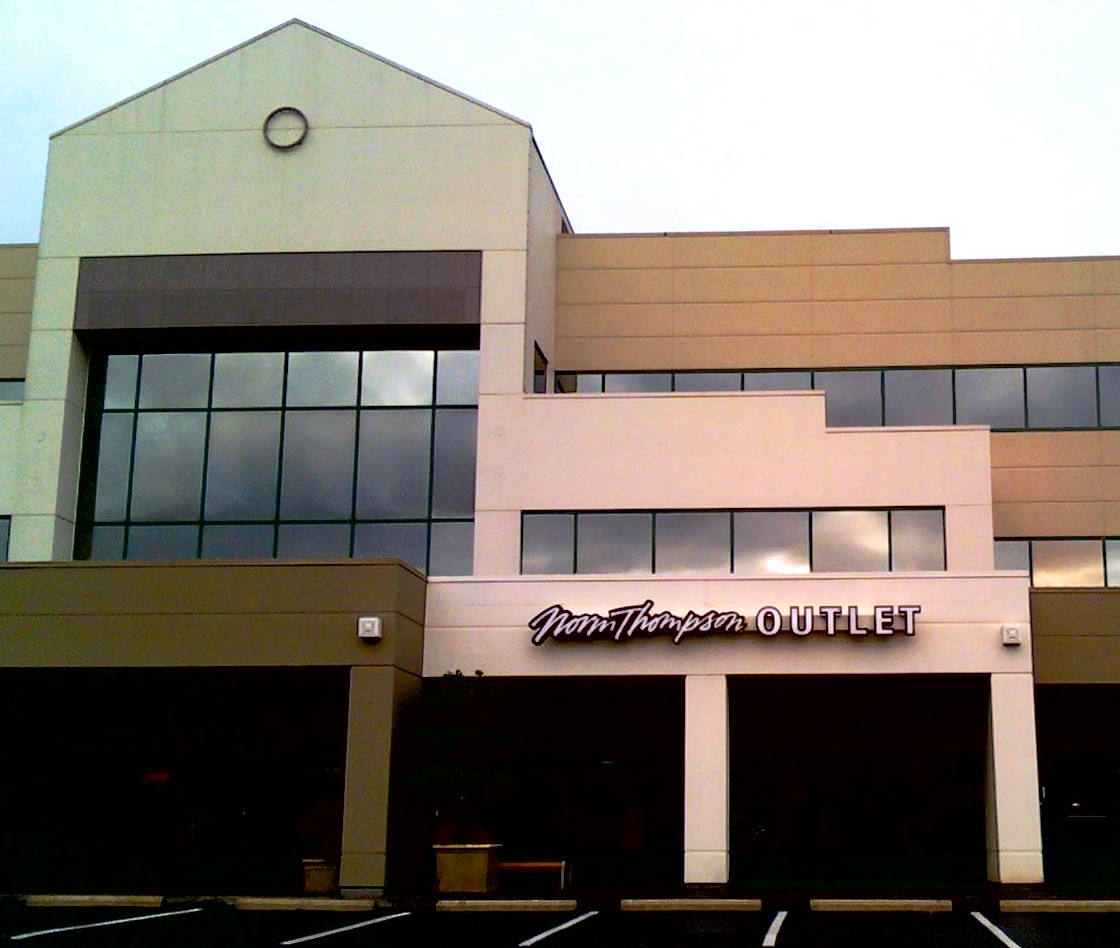
Outlet location in Lake Oswego, Oregon

By 1989, the company had grown to annual sales of $50 million, with 80 percent coming from the mail order business. At that time the company's headquarters and distribution center were in Beaverton, Oregon, along the Sunset Highway at Murray Boulevard. Growth came from creating new catalogs and through acquisitions such as the purchase of Seattle-based Early Winters. Products ranged from upscale clothing to gourmet food to gadgets and other unusual gift items. Ron Decker took over as president of the company in 1989, as Emrick retained the titles of chairman and chief executive officer (CEO).

Norm Thompson Outfitters also conducted a once a year warehouse sale in June that brought in around $1 million in revenue through selling closeout type items. In October 1990, the company opened a new outlet location in Lake Oswego, Oregon. A Norm Thompson's catalog was named the 1990 Catalog of the Year by the National Direct Mail Marketing Association. Sales grew to around $70 million in 1991. A downtown Portland retail store was added in May 1993 across from the Pioneer Place shopping center on Fourth Avenue at a cost of $1 million. The 7,200-square-foot (670 m^{2}) store was unprofitable and closed in 1996.

Also in May 1993, the company announced it would relocate the Oregon distribution center to the eastern U.S. to be closer to the majority of its customers. That October, Norm Thompson selected a site in Jefferson County, West Virginia for a new 173,000-square-foot (16,100 m^{2}), $7.5 million distribution facility. At that time, 80 percent of the company's sales were east of the Mississippi River. Norm Thompson closed the Oregon distribution center in July 1994, and sold the site to Home Depot to become a home improvement store. The building had also served as company headquarters, with the business moving to temporary offices near Tektronix's then headquarters while they planned a new permanent headquarters in the Portland metropolitan area. In 1994, sales had grown to $100 million annually, and the company had around 350 full-time, permanent employees.

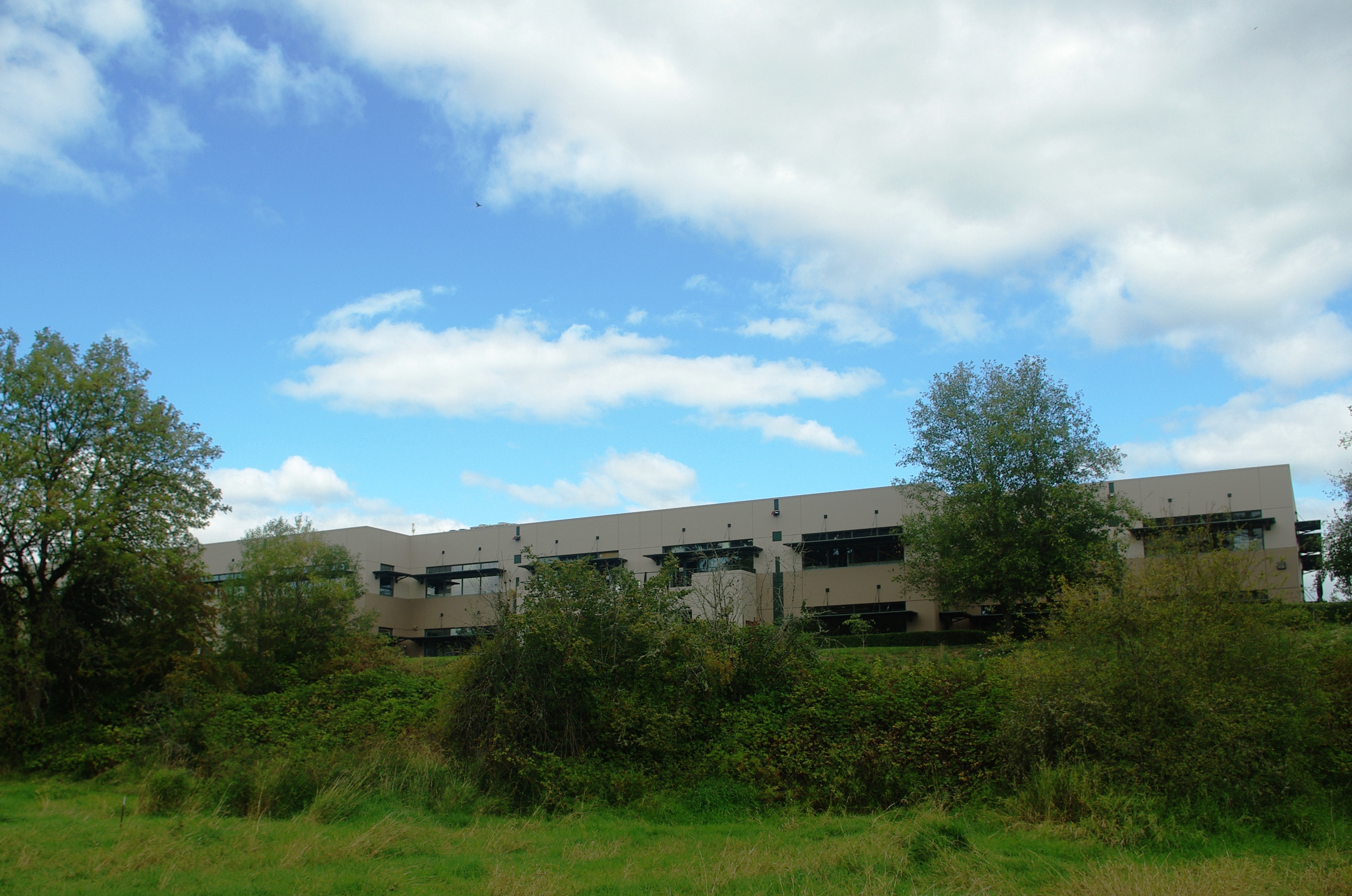
Company headquarters in Hillsboro

Construction began on the new headquarters in Hillsboro in February 1995 where the company would lease a 54,500-square-foot (5,060 m^{2}) building that would cost $6 million to build. Located in the Tanasbourne neighborhood, the two-story building was to house around 200 employees, with an adjacent call center for 150 employees. Designed by Sienna Architects and developed by the Trammell Crow Company, the new building was constructed using some recycled materials. The plan used many energy efficient designs and technology to create a building 40 percent more efficient than what Oregon law required.

Norm Thompson grew to sales of $110 million and 400 employees for 1995, but had to cut back the next year when they closed the downtown Portland store along with shutting down The Primary Layer catalog. Cuts were made due to poor economic conditions. At the time, catalog sales represented 90 percent of revenues, and the closed catalog only contributed around 7 percent. After the closures, they still had two Portland stores and three outlet locations in Oregon. Also in 1996, Rebecca Jewett took over as president of the company while John Emrick retained his titles as chairman and CEO. The city of Portland gave the company a Businesses for an Environmentally Sustainable Tomorrow award for energy efficiency in 1997. Following the 2001 anthrax attacks, Norm Thompson stopped using corn starch in the catalog printing process to avoid the appearance of any powdery substance on the catalogs.

Because of Norm Thompson Outfitters' use of environmentally friendly practices, including using recycled paper in catalogs, the Center for a New American Dream inducted the company into the Green Mail Hall of Fame in 2004. The company expanded their headquarters in 2005 by leasing an adjacent building. In March 2006, the company closed its original store in northwest Portland, leaving two outlet stores and the location at the Portland Airport as their only retail locations. At that time, sales at the company had grown to approximately $200 million annually, with the Sahalie and Solutions brands as the largest divisions. Sahalie had previously been the Early Winters brand and catalog.

That same month Golden Gate Capital Partners' Catalog Holdings subsidiary purchased Norm Thompson. Catalog Holdings already owned brands such as Spiegel and Newport News. Neale Attenborough took over as CEO from Emrick after the sale. The Hillsboro call center was closed in 2007 with those operations consolidated with a sister company's operations in Pennsylvania, while the headquarters remained in Hillsboro with 150 employees. By 2008, the store at the Portland Airport had closed to be replaced by a Columbia Sportswear store.

In May 2016, the company announced that it would be closing its Hillsboro headquarters, in late summer 2016. Around 80 people were working there, of which 46 were to be laid off and the others potentially relocated. Only 13 were due to continue working in the area, at a new satellite office near the to-be-closed headquarters office on Aloclek Drive.

== Operations ==
Norm Thompson Outfitters was headquartered in Middleton, Massachusetts, while the distribution center is in Irvine, Pennsylvania. They sell high-end items ranging from men's and women's apparel to shoes, food, gift items. Furniture, and kitchenware among other products. More than 80 percent of customers are women. The Solutions brand is the biggest seller followed by the main Norm Thompson catalog and Sahalie.
