= Bryan Alexander (futurist) =

US futurist and academic

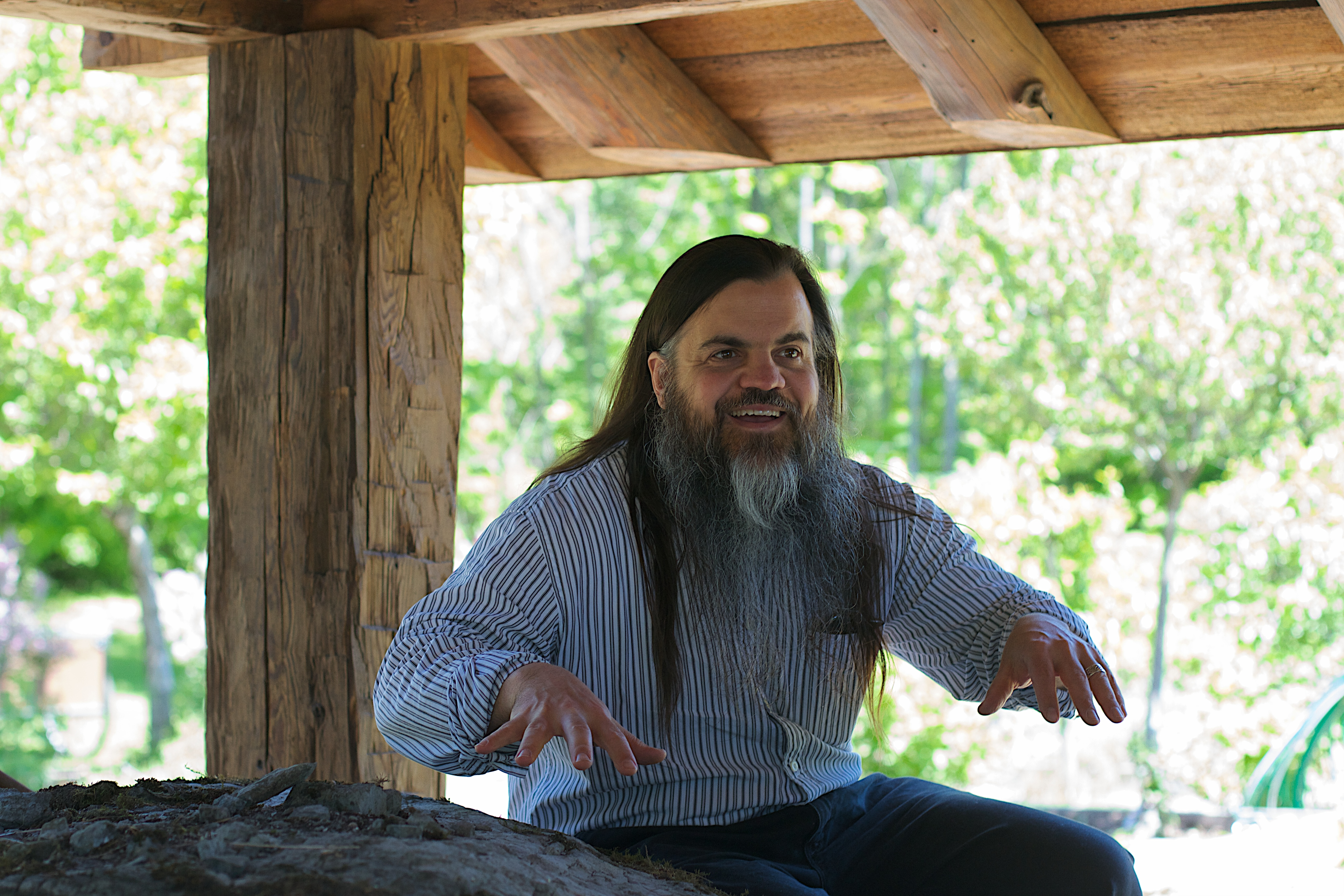
- Alexander in 2013
- Born: February 1967 (age 59); New York City
- Education: University of Michigan
- Occupations: Futurist, author
- Spouse: Ceredwyn Alexander
- Website: https://bryanalexander.org/

Bryan Alexander is an American futurist and author who is a Georgetown University Senior Scholar and the creator of The Future of Higher Education Observatory. He is a contributor to the academic and popular culture conversation about higher education.

== Early life and education ==
Bryan Alexander was born and raised in New York City. He earned his bachelors, masters, and Ph.D. degrees from the University of Michigan. He began his career as an assistant professor of English at Centenary College of Louisiana before moving to Vermont to lead the Center of Educational Technology at Middlebury College. He then worked for the National Institute for Technology in Liberal Education (NITLE) as a senior director.

== Career ==
In 2013, Alexander began an independent consultancy as a higher education futurist.

Alexander lived in rural Vermont in a house that used woodstoves for heat, for which he chopped and split wood. He adopted aspects of a homesteader or "prepper" lifestyle during this time. In 2018, 'Ozy' magazine referred to him as an "Ax-Wielding Futurist".

One of Alexander's ideas is about the "academic queen sacrifice." Alexander argues that US higher education has been reducing the numbers and the power of academic workers, and this puts higher education in peril.

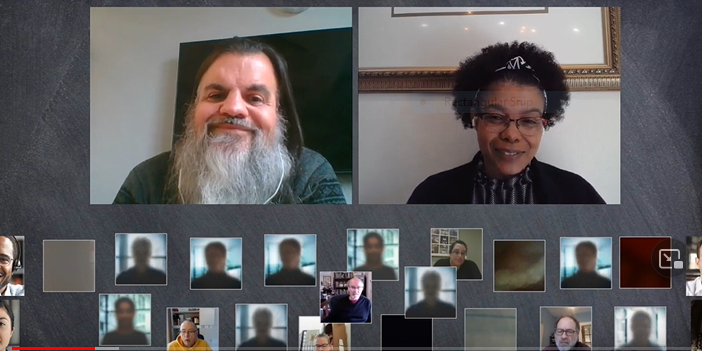
Alexander and Terri Givens at Future Trends Forum, 2022

Since 2016, Alexander has been hosting Future Trends Forum, a video conversation about the future of higher education.

=== Writing ===
In Academia Next (2020), Alexander's work written before the COVID-19 pandemic, he describes the possibilities and challenges of a pandemic upon higher education, and covers several trends including demographic transition, escalating economic inequality, rising campus costs and student debt, open education (OER, open access), increasing multimedia tools, platforms, content, creativity, and rising automation. In 2020 it received an award from the Association of Professional Futurists (APF); Alexander is one of nine members on the APF international board.

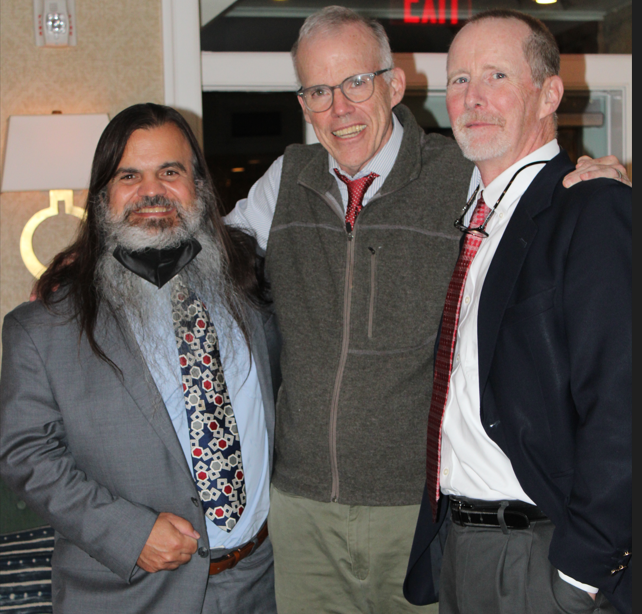
Alexander, climate activist Bill McKibben, and Mark Rush, 2022

Universities on Fire was published by Johns Hopkins University Press in March 2023. A review said it has a "simple message: The climate crisis is real, there are fires everywhere, and 'it is up to us to choose if those will be flames of destruction or the lights of illumination.'”
