= Favorite Flies and Their Histories =

1892 fly fishing book by Mary Orvis Marbury

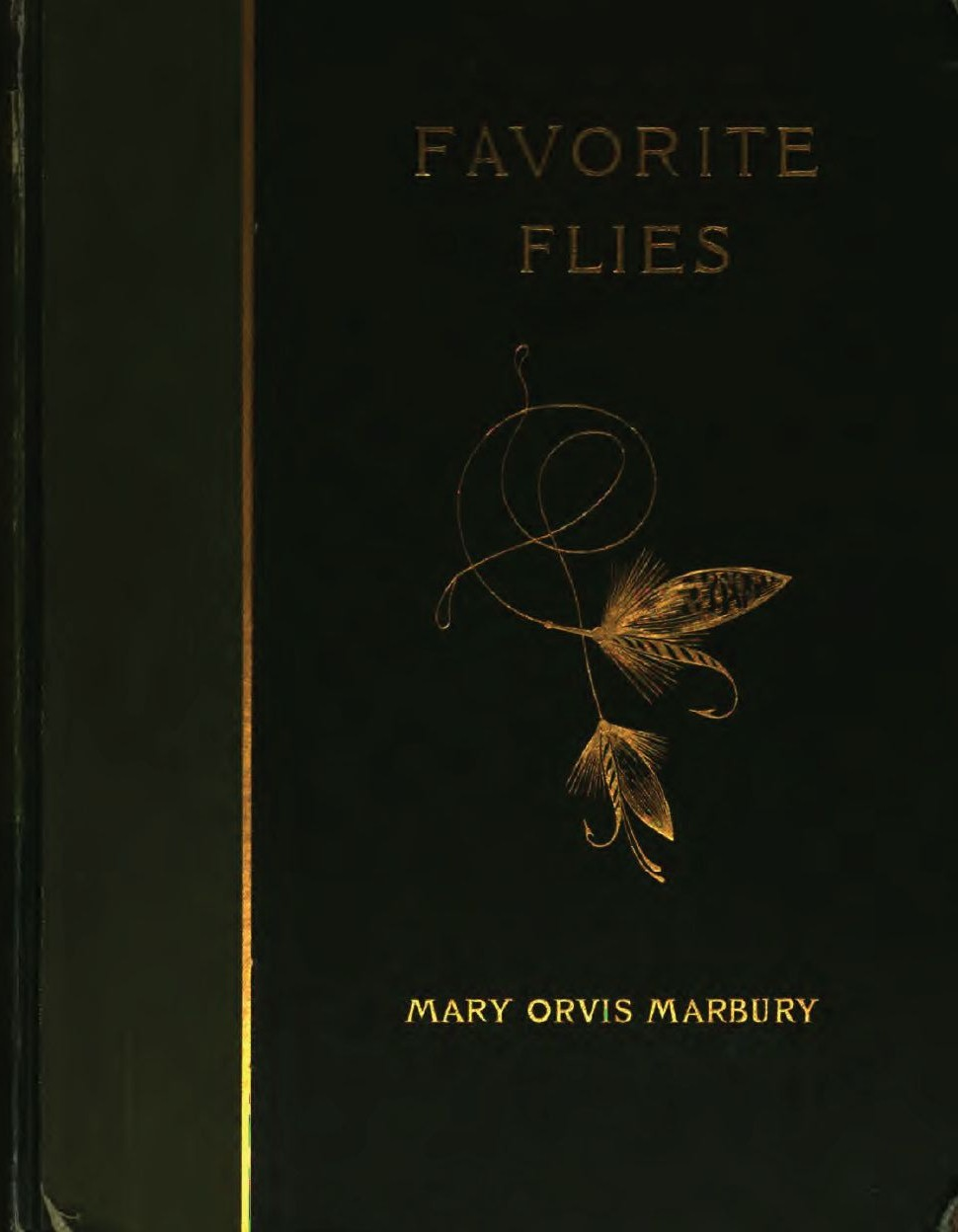
- Author: Mary Orvis Mabury
- Language: English
- Subject: Fly fishing
- Publisher: Houghton, Mifflin and Co. Boston and New York
- Publication date: 1892
- Publication place: United States
- Pages: 522

Favorite Flies and Their Histories - With many replies from practical anglers to inquiries concerning how, when and where to use them-Illustrated by Thirty-two colored plates of flies, six engravings of natural insects and eight reproductions of photographs is a fly fishing book written by Mary Orvis Marbury published in Boston in April 1892 by Houghton Mifflin. It was considered by most fly fishers as the standard reference on flies in its era.

== Synopsis ==
Favorite Flies is a unique volume that compiles the stories and images of popular American artificial flies of the late 19th century. It is one of the earliest works to use chromolithography color plates. Today, the original flies used to create the color plates are preserved in the American Museum of Fly Fishing in Manchester, Vermont. The stories for each fly described in the volume were obtained through correspondence with fly fisherman and fly tiers throughout the U.S. and Canada. The following is a typical story about the Professor, a popular wet-fly of time:

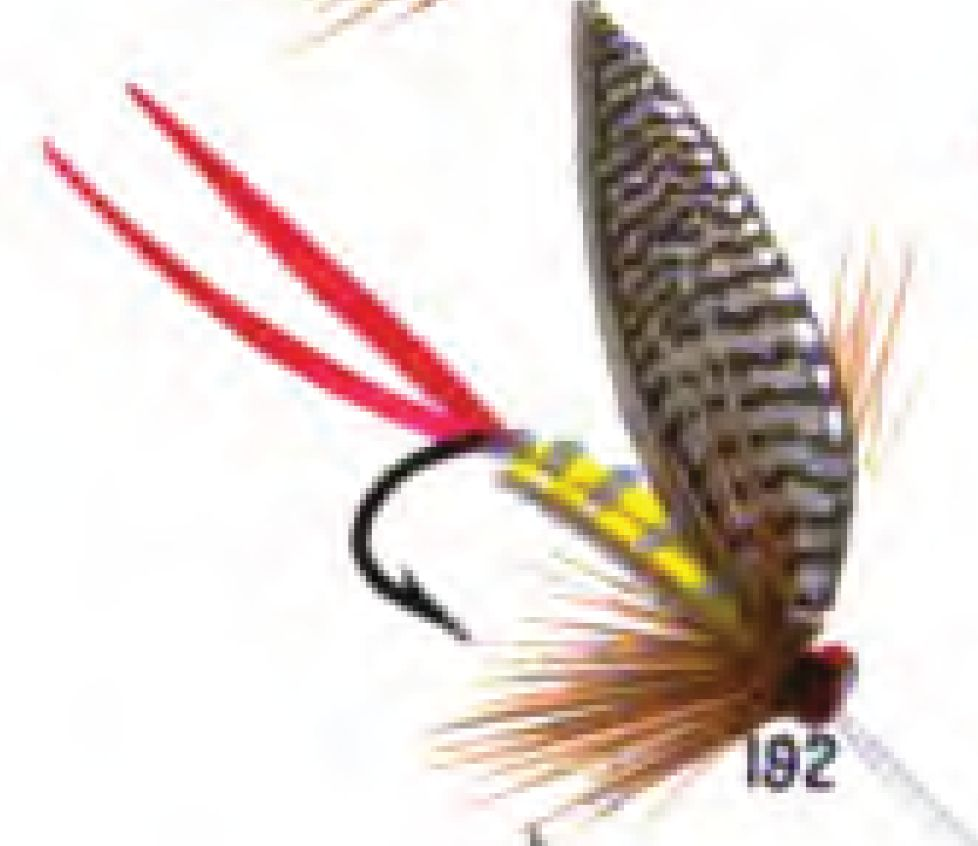
No. 192 - Professor from Plate T - Trout Flies

No. 192. The Professor was named after the much-loved Professor John Wilson (Christopher North), and the story of the fly is, that one time, when this famous angler Was fishing, he ran short of flies, and, to create something of a flylike appearance, he fastened the petals of buttercups on his hook, adding bits of leaves or grass to imitate the wings of a fly. This arrangement was so successful that it led to the making of the fly with a yellow silk body, since then was widely known as the Professor

Professor. - A prime favorite; use it on almost all casts when I see more than one fly. When using a black tail fly, I use a brown fly and a Professor for droppers; find it a good fly under general conditions, when using a Miller for tail fly; then use Professor for droppers. From a letter from W. David Tomlin ("Norman") Duluth, Minn as favorite flies for trout in Michigan streams.

Favorite Flies contains plates and stories for Bass Flies, Trout Flies, Hackles, Salmon Flies, and Lake Flies

== Reviews ==
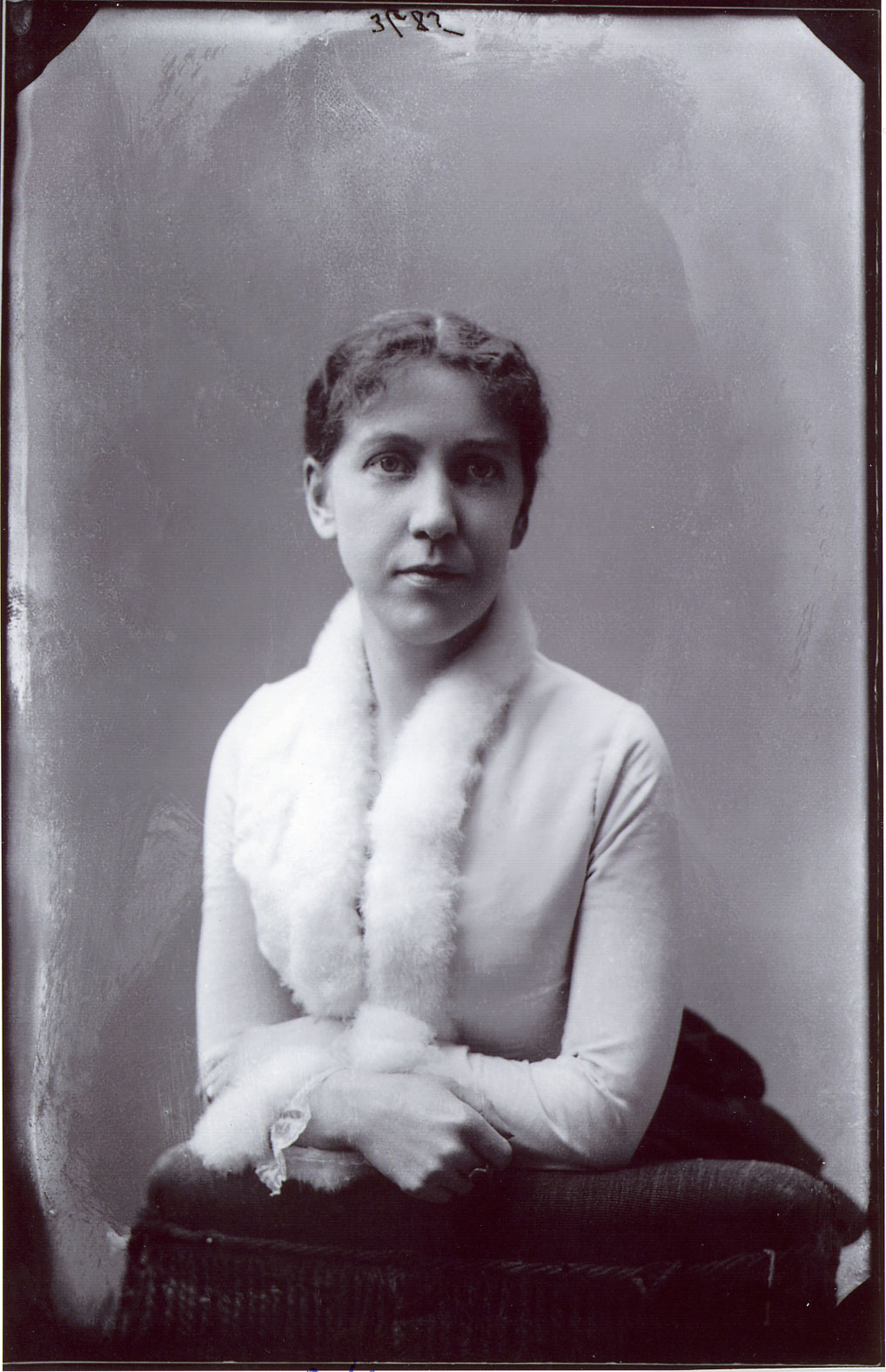
Author Mary Orvis Marbury, circa 1870

- The American Fly Fisher wrote in The Mary Orvis Marbury Fly Plates (1979):

The legacy of Mary Marbury, through her book and her leadership in Orvis's commercial fly-tying operation, is the standardization of American fly patterns. Her book Favorite Flies and Their Histories, remains one of the most significant landmarks in American fly tying literature.

- Charles F. Waterman wrote in his A History of Angling (1981):

Mary Orvis Marbury, daughter of Charles F. Orvis, produced Favorite Flies and their Histories in 1892. While it may not complete favorably with later works on entomology, it certainly is unique for its time. It included a practical treatise on fly classification

- In 1988 Ann Barry of the New York Times wrote:

WHEN Mary Orvis Marbury died in 1914, the English Fishing Gazette acclaimed her as the most famous but one female angling author. (The other was Dame Juliana Berners, an Englishwoman who wrote A Treatyse of Fysshying Wyth an Angle in 1496.) Marbury's Favorite Flies and Their Histories, which became a best seller among anglers after it appeared in 1892 and went through nine printings by 1896, has recently been reprinted by the Wellfleet Press.

- In Royal Coachman-The Lore and Legends of Fly Fishing, Paul Schullery wrote:

Mary Orvis Marbury produced one of American fishing literature's milestone volumes, Favorite Flies and Their Histories (1892), which not only served generations as the bible of fly patterns but further strengthened the company's reputation for expertise and reliability

- Dr. Andrew Herd, noted fly fishing historian comments on Favorite Flies in his 2001 The Fly:

...the book which captured the American wet-fly tradition at its peak was Charles' [Orvis] daughter's Favorite Flies. Mary ran the Orvis company's fly tying department and she was inspired to set pen to paper when she realised how little standardization there was among fly patterns... The answers were compiled and key to colour plates in a book which was still in print sixty years later, such was its popularity

== Contents ==
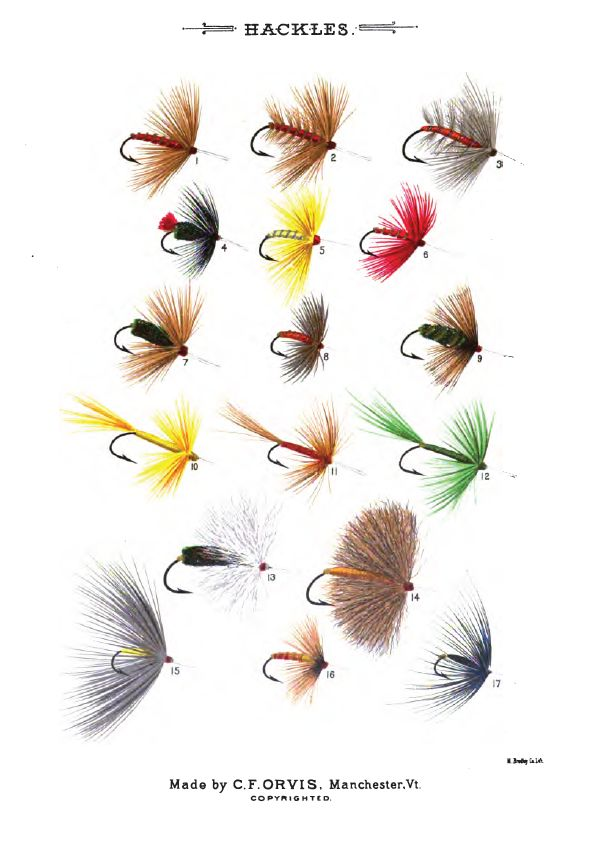
Plate A - Hackles

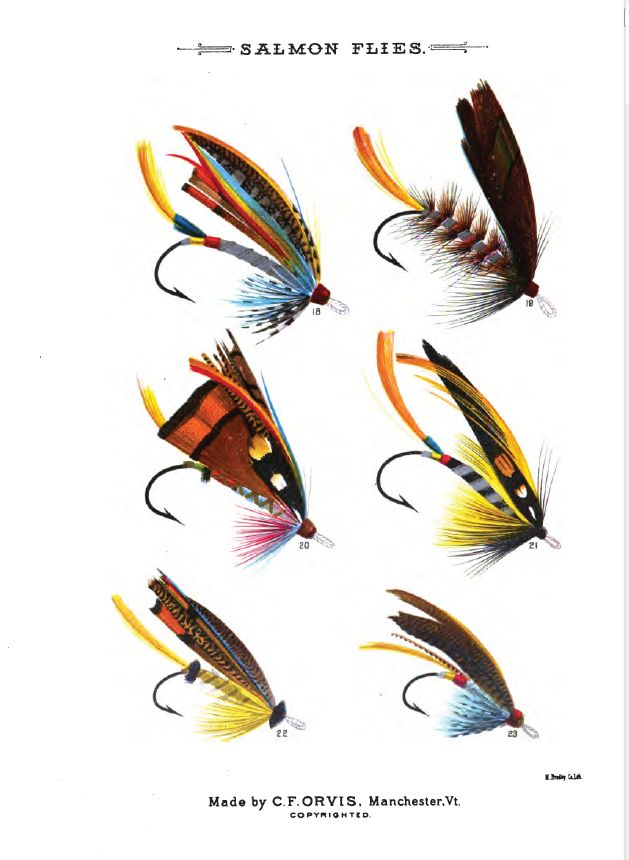
Plate B - Salmon Flies

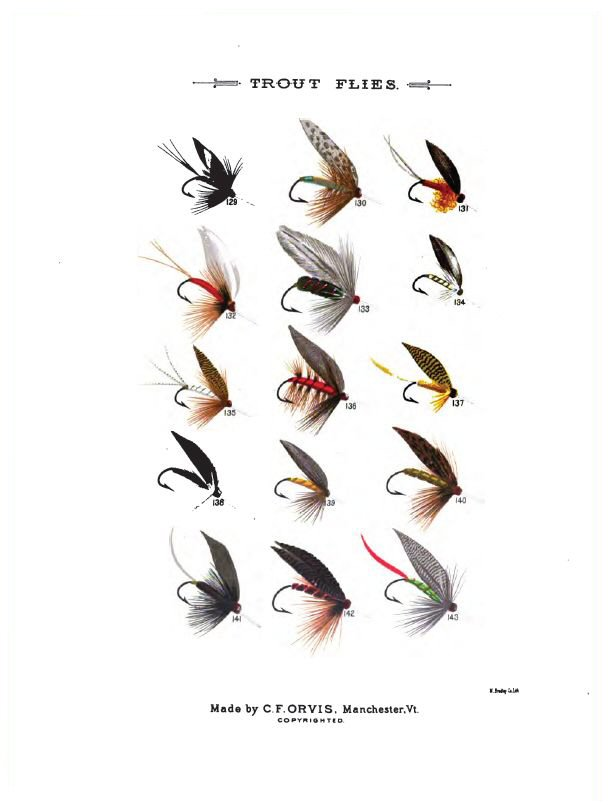
Plate P - Trout Flies

- Part I
  - Insects, Natural and Artificial - 1
  - History of the Red Hackle - 28
- Part II
  - Prefatory - 45
  - Histories of the favorite flies, accompanied by letters relating to their use in:
    - Canada - 46
    - Maine -
    - Vermont and New Hampshire - 128
    - Connecticut, Massachusetts, and Rhode Island - 144
    - New York - 160
    - Pennsylvania, New Jersey and Delaware - 226
    - Virginia and West Virginia - 266
    - Ohio - 306
    - Missouri, Iowa, Indiana and Illinois - 334
    - Michigan - 368
    - Minnesota and Wisconsin - 392
    - Maryland, Tennessee, Kentucky, Georgia and Mississippi - 406
    - Florida, Louisiana, Texas, Arizona and Nevada - 418
    - Colorado, Utah, Wyoming and Idaho - 432
    - Montana - 448
    - Washington - 472
    - California - 482
    - Oregon - 492
  - "Hic Habitat Felicitas" - 510
  - Index of Plates and Flies - 515
  - List of Correspondents - 520
- List of Illustrations
  - Disputing the Fly Question - Frontispiece
  - Stoneflies - 13
  - Drakes - 15
  - Caddis Flies - 17
  - Crane Flies and Spiders - 19
  - House Flies and Ants - 21
  - Beetles and Chrysopa - 23
  - Plate A - Hackles - 27
  - Plate B - Salmon Flies - 39
  - Portrait of Charles F. Orvis - 45
  - Plate C - Salmon Flies - 63
  - Plate D - Salmon Flies - 81
  - A Pleasant Memory - 93
  - Plate E - Lake Flies - 95
  - Plate F - Lake Flies - 113
  - Plate G - Lake Flies - 125
  - Plate H - Lake Flies - 139
  - Plate I - Lake Flies - 157
  - Plate J - Lake Flies - 171
  - Plate K - Lake Flies - 189
  - Plate L - Lake Flies - 199
  - Plate M - Trout Flies - 221
  - Plate N - Trout Flies - 239
  - Plate O - Trout Flies - 255
  - Equinox, the Edge of the Shadows - 261
  - Plate P - Trout Flies - 277
  - Plate Q - Trout Flies - 297
  - Plate R - Trout Flies - 315
  - Plate S - Trout Flies - 327
  - Plate T - Trout Flies - 349
  - Plate U - Trout Flies - 363
  - Plate V - Trout Flies - 379
  - Plate W - Bass Flies - 389
  - Plate X - Bass Flies - 401
  - Plate Y - Bass Flies - 413
  - Plate Z - Bass Flies - 427
  - Plate AA - Bass Flies - 441
  - The Ondawa - 442
  - "Up the Long Road" - 443
  - Plate BB - Bass Flies - 457
  - Manchester - 459
  - Plate CC - Bass Flies - 469
  - Plate DD - Bass Flies - 479
  - Plate EE - Bass Flies - 489
  - Plate FF - Bass Flies - 503
  - "Hic Habitat Felicitas" - 510

== Other editions ==
From Antiquarian Book Exchange:

- Marbury, Mary Orvis (1892). Favorite Flies and Their Histories (1st Edition, 2nd Printing ed.). Boston and New York: Houghton Mifflin and Company.
- Marbury, Mary Orvis (1892). Favorite Flies and Their Histories (1st UK ed.). London: Sampson, Low, Marston and Co.
- Marbury, Mary Orvis (1955). Favorite Flies and Their Histories (Reprint ed.). London: Phoenix House.
- Marbury, Mary Orvis (1988). Favorite Flies and Their Histories (1892 reprint ed.). Secaucus, NJ: Wellfleet Press. ISBN 1-55521-241-7.
- Marbury, Mary Orvis (1995). Favorite Flies and Their Histories (1892 reprint ed.). Secaucus, NJ: Wellfleet Press. ISBN 1-55521-241-7.
- Marbury, Mary Orvis (2001). Favorite Flies and Their Histories (Paperback reprint ed.). Guilford, Connecticut: Lyons Press. ISBN 1-58574-315-1.

== See also ==
- Bibliography of fly fishing
