= The Chemistry Between Us (book) =

2012 book by Larry J. Young and Brian Alexander

- Author: Larry J. Young, Brian Alexander
- Language: English
- Subjects: Human sexuality love
- Genre: Non-fiction
- Publication date: 2012
- Publication place: USA
- ISBN: 978-1591846611

The Chemistry Between Us: Love, Sex, and the Science of Attraction is a 2012 book by the American neuroscientist Larry J. Young and the journalist Brian Alexander, in which the authors examine the neurobiological roots of love.

== Reception ==
The book was well received by critics. Supportive reviews appeared in New Scientist, Publishers Weekly, Kirkus Reviews etc.

The book has been translated into many languages including Polish and Russian.
