= Orvis =

American retail and mail-order business

The Orvis Company
- Type: Private
- Industry: Retail
- Founded: 1856 (170 years ago) in Manchester, Vermont, US
- Founder: Charles F. Orvis
- Headquarters: Manchester, Vermont
- Number of locations: 64 retail stores, 7 outlet stores
- Key people: President: Simon Perkins
- Products: Clothing, gift/home, fly fishing, dogs, luggage and outdoor equipment
- Revenue: ▲US$316 million (2021)
- Owner: Perkins family
- Number of employees: 1,500 (2021)
- Website: orvis.com

Orvis is an American family-owned retail and mail-order business which specializes in selling fly fishing, hunting and sporting goods. Founded in Manchester, Vermont, in 1856 by Charles F. Orvis to sell fishing tackle, it is the oldest mail-order retailer in the United States.

Orvis operates 40 retail stores and 1 outlet/warehouse locations in the US and 1 retail store and one outlet store in the UK. The firm produces flies and fly-tying tools, employing professional tyers like A.K. Best and Tom Rosenbauer to create new versions for sale. Owned by the Perkins family since 1965, the company has transferred ownership twice and has had five CEOs in its history.

== History ==
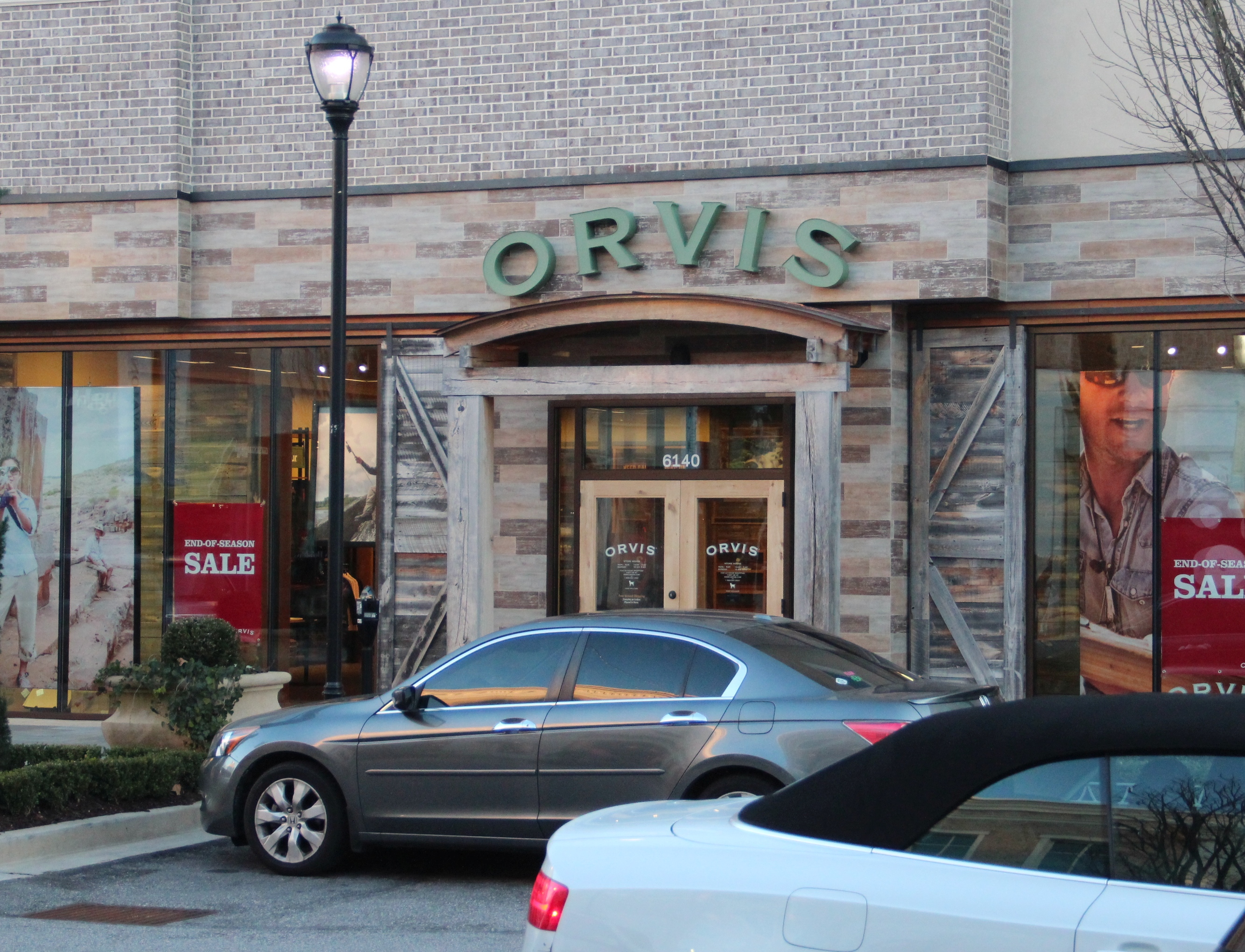
An Orvis in Avalon, Alpharetta, Georgia

Charles F. Orvis opened a tackle shop in Manchester, Vermont, in 1856. The C.F. Orvis Company operated in close proximity to the Equinox House, a hotel opened by his brother in 1853. The brothers were soon able to build a trout pond for the hotel. By 1870, Charles had moved into a factory building on Union Street. He also began sending out catalogues, which predated more famous ones from Sears, Roebuck by more than 20 years.

In 1874, he received his first patent for a new reel design. His fly reel was described by reel historian Jim Brown as the "benchmark of American reel design," the first fully modern fly reel. In 1880, outdoor writer Ned Buntline named the Orvis bamboo rod the best of its weight in the world. The company introduced its glass minnow trap in 1885.

Charles's daughter, Mary Orvis Marbury, took charge of the Orvis fly department in the 1870s and helped standardized fly lures. By 1890, the company's catalogue included a full line of Orvis Superfine Flies, including over 400 different patterns. In 1892, she published Favorite Flies and Their Histories, an encyclopaedic reference book on fly patterns made up of letters from Orvis customers It went through nine reprints by 1896. The illustrations were exhibited at the 1893 Chicago World’s Columbian Exposition.

Following Charles's death in 1915, sons Albert and Robert managed the company. They automated the process of splitting and planing bamboo used to make rods. By the 1920s, the company was producing four grades of rods and 500 varieties of flies. However, the company financially collapsed during the Great Depression of the 1930s. Following the death of Robert in 1939, Orvis had just two remaining employees.

=== Purchase by Dudley Corkran ===
Investors, led by Philadelphia businessman-sportsman Dudley Corkran, purchased Orvis in 1939 for US$4,500 (equal to $104,157 today), and revitalized the business. Under Corkran, the company began to offer other product lines, including clothing.

It opened its first retail location in 1941. During World War II, Orvis was contracted to produce ski poles for US ski troops in Alaska. Food rationing and German harassment on saltwater fishing fleets also made freshwater fishing popular again, helping the company to survive on the sales of its traps. Corkran hired master bamboo rod builder Wesley Jordan to head up the company's production efforts. In 1946, Jordan had developed a Bakelite impregnation process that made Orvis bamboo rods more immune to weather and rot.

After the war, as fiberglass claimed the fishing rod market, Orvis competed with bamboo rod builders, such as Payne, Gillum, and Garrison, while its fiberglass and graphite rods competed with Shakespeare and Fenwick. In 1956, the company held its 100th anniversary and opened its flagship retail location in Manchester, Vermont. By the 1960s, Orvis was producing about 2,500 rods each year.

=== Sale to the Perkins family ===
In 1965 after nine months of negotiations with Corkran, Leigh H. Perkins (27 November 1927 - 7 May 2021) bought Orvis for $400,000, equal to $2,043,295 today. Perkins had since his youth held an admiration for the company which he purchased using $200,000 in savings and the rest in the form of a loan. At the time the company had 20 employees and $500,000 in annual sales. In 1966, Perkins established the Orvis fly fishing school in Manchester, Vermont. In 1967, the company introduced the first pin-on reel. By 1969, Orvis was releasing four seasonal catalogs per year.

Perkins pioneered the trading of customer mailing lists among his chief competitors, including Abercrombie & Fitch, L.L. Bean, Eddie Bauer and Norm Thompson. In 1972, the company introduced the CFO, the first modern exposed-rim, skeleton frame, superlight fly reel. By 1972, Orvis had fly fishing schools in Pennsylvania, Montana, Colorado, and Wyoming. In 1974, it opened the Orvis Shooting School on the Batten Kill in Manchester, Vermont. The company introduced its fish graphite fly rod in 1975. It started selling the Orvis Dog Nest bed in 1976.

By 1982, the company had fishing schools in California and Oregon. Under chief rod builder Howard Steere, Orvis became a large manufacturer of fly rods and reels in the development of graphite fly rods. The company opened a retail store at the corner of Madison Avenue and 45th Street in Manhattan in 1984. That same year, it also introduced sporting-clays to the United States in Houston and launched a tournament in 1991. It also released the Ultra Fine, a two-weight graphite rod. In 1987, the company opened a fulfillment centre in Roanoke, Virginia. In 1988, Orvis introduced its 25-year warranty. In 1989, Tom Peters, author of In Search of Excellence, named the Orvis fly rod one of the five best products made in the United States in the 1980s. Historian Kenneth Cameron has written that Perkins' accomplishment was to "define the look of contemporary fly fishing and the entire social universe in which it fits, no small achievement." In 1990, the company purchased Gokey, a leading hunting boot manufacturer since 1850.

In 1992, Perkins retired and turned the company over to his sons, Leigh H. "Perk" Perkins Jr. and Dave Perkins. By this point, Orvis had grown to have annual sales of $90 million, more than 700 employees, 16 stores, and 400 dealers. That year, it also received a special thanks in the credits of A River Runs Through It for supplying the film's crew with waders and vests. In 1993, the company saw a 40% increase in mail orders for fly fishing equipment, helping it top $100 million in sales. It also acquired British Fly Reel, the largest producer of fly reels in the world. By 1994, Orvis was making $115-million per year. In 1995, launched its website. It also teamed with Jeep to release the Grand Cherokee Orvis Edition, which included luxury equipment. In 1997, it acquired a majority share in the Florida-based Redington Fly Rods & Reels, which were known for their value-priced rods. Gross sales reached $200 that year. In 2000, the company acquired the Ex Officio clothing brand. By 2002, it had fly-casting schools in nine locations, including Millbrook, New York; Evergreen, Colorado, Mammoth Lakes, California, and northern Georgia.

Under the leadership of Perkins' sons, then-CEO Leigh ("Perk") Perkins, Jr., and Executive Vice Chairman Dave Perkins, Orvis continued to thrive and revenue more than tripled. However, the company's growth had strained its sense of direction. Between 1982 and 2000, Orvis had purchased six other firms, most of whose own identities did not mesh well with Orvis and thus put the clarity of the brand at risk. As a result, a rebranding effort began in 2000 to focus Orvis as a name synonymous with a distinctive, outdoor style of living. It sold Ex Officio in 2004. In 2005, the company began selling luxury log homes.

By 2009, the company had 70 retail and outlet stores in the United States and United Kingdom. It also maintained a distribution list of 60 million across 14 catalogs. Orvis acquired the Scientific Anglers and Ross Reels businesses from 3M. Within months, Ross was sold to Mayfly Group LLC, owner of Abel Reels.

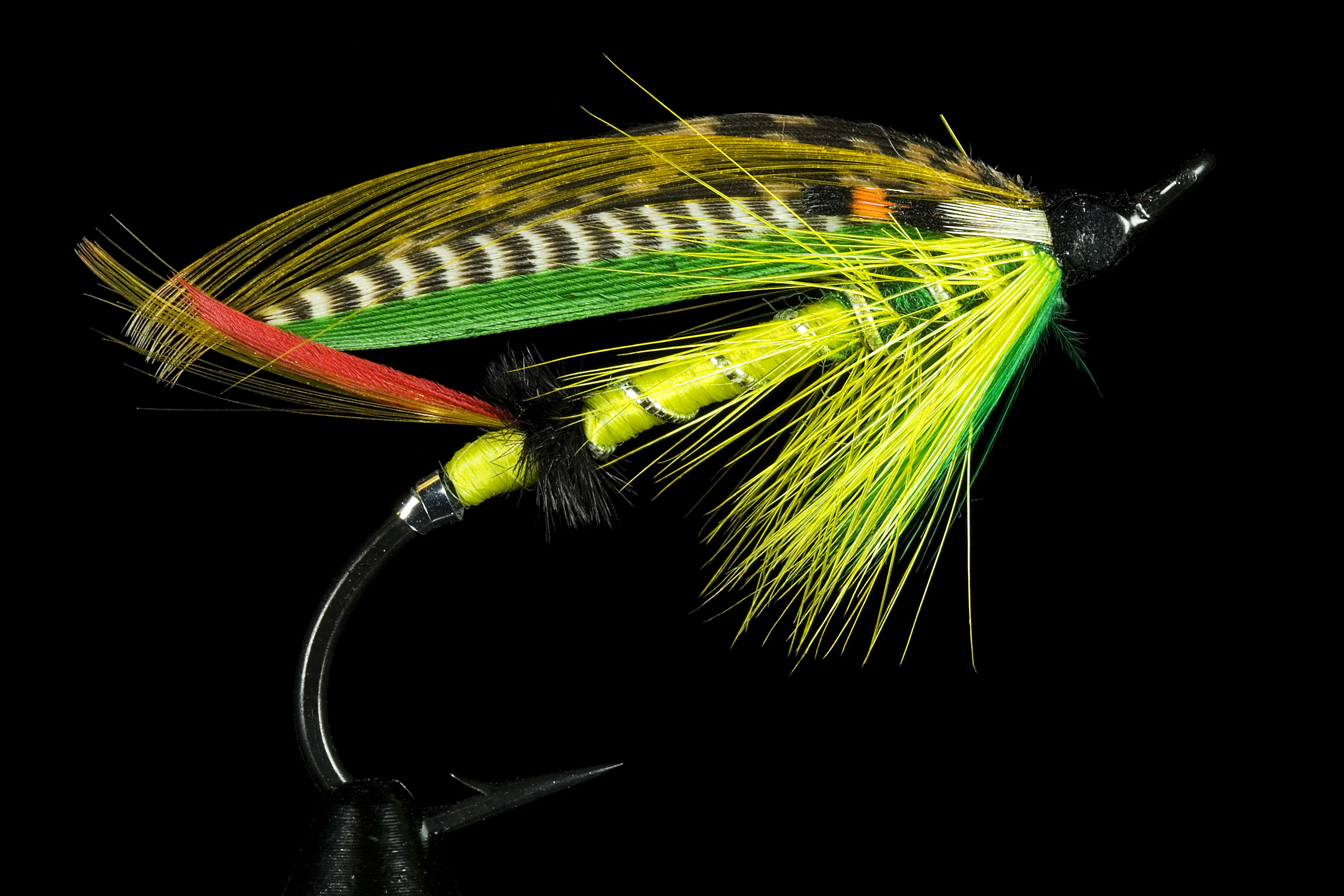
An Orvis Green Highlander salmon fly.

In 2017, Orvis launched an initiative to focus on gender equality in fly fishing by offering educational events for women. At the beginning of 2020, Orvis employed 1,700 people across its 80 U.S. retail locations and corporate headquarters. However, due to the ongoing COVID-19 pandemic, the company announced in April a series of layoffs and furloughs affecting its workforce. Executives also took pay cuts and the board of directors suspended compensation. In May 2020, the company announced that Simon Perkins, the son of Leigh “Perk” Perkins and grandson of Leigh H. Perkins, would serve as company president. Orvis sold off its Gokey boot brand in July.

In 2024, the company moved its corporate headquarters from Sunderland to its Manchester campus that already includes its flagship store, outlet, fishing school, and rod shop. In October 2024, Orvis announced the elimination of 8% of its workforce and the closure of some stores in an effort to streamline operations. It also discontinued its catalog, a staple of the company for 170 years, as part of a strategic shift towards digital engagement and sustainability efforts. The company was left with 64 stores and seven outlets. However, due to the economic conditions created by President Trump's tariffs, Orvis announced further closures a year later. By 2026, the company would reduce its store count to 33 stores and two outlets. In an effort to refocus the brand, it also stopped producing lifestyle clothing and home goods.

== Orvis UK ==
In 1982, Orvis expanded its mail-order and retail business to England. Starting in Stockbridge, the company expanded to Burford, Bakewell, Edinburgh, London and more.

The company held its first Orvis Saltwater Fly Fishing Festival in Chichester, England in September 2020. In 2022, Orvis announced it would close all stores in the UK, except for the one in Stockbridge, in order to focus on fly fishing. The Andover office was closed. The company's Sporting Adventures and festivals, would continue.

== Orvis Adventures ==
Orvis markets its experiential offerings under the Orvis Adventures name. This includes fly fishing and wingshooting trips, group trips, Orvis schools, as well as Orvis' network of partnered lodges and guides.

=== Orvis-Endorsed Program ===
The company established the Orvis-Endorsed Lodge Outfitter and Guide Program in 1984 with a small number of operations and guides in the Rocky Mountains. By 2008, there were 80 Orvis-Endorsed lodges. By 2020, the program included 250 fly fishing and wingshooting guides, outfitters, and lodges in North America.

=== Shooting grounds ===
Orvis operates three shooting grounds in the United States that offer sporting clays, hunting, fishing, and on-site instruction. In 1994, the company purchased the Sandanona estate in Millbrook, New York. It had been the first licensed game bird preserve in the country. In 2016, Orvis opened its shooting grounds at Pursell Farms in Sylacuaga, Alabama. In 2018, the company acquired the Hill Country Shooting Grounds in Blue Ridge Summit, Pennsylvania. Orvis remodeled the grounds and reopened in 2019.

== Conservation programs ==
Orvis's conservation activism began with Charles Orvis's work in fisheries conservation and management in the late 19th century and has continued since. Leigh Perkins continued with conservationism as a company value, donating to wildlife organizations before such practices were widespread. In 1994 Perkins was recognized for his efforts when he received the Chevron Corporation's Chevron Conservation Award for lifetime achievements in conservation.

The company's corporate mission statement includes an economic and ethical mandate to support conservation projects and organizations. Since the 1960s, Orvis has championed the protection of the Battenkill River and other natural waterways. Since the 1970s, Orvis has annually donated five percent of its pretax profits to conservation projects in cooperation with the Atlantic Salmon Federation, The Nature Conservancy, National Fish and Wildlife Foundation, the Ruffled Grouse Society, and Trout Unlimited among others.

== Publications ==
Orvis has published many books over the course of its existence. The company also came to be known for its newspaper.

=== Books ===
In 1883, Charles F. Orvis and A. Nelson Cheney published the book Fishing with the Fly: Sketches by Lovers of the Art, with Illustrations of Standard Flies. The 333 page book was cloth-bound, contained 24 articles by well known fly fishers, and contained colored plates of 149 standard trout, salmon, and bass flies. Featured writers included Charles Hallock, William Cowper Prime, Robert Roosevelt, James Alexander Henshall, and Ned Buntline.

In 1892, Charles' daughter Mary Orvis Marbury published Favorite Flies and Their Histories, an encyclopedic reference book on fly patterns. The book was largely made up of letters from Orvis customers. Considered the standard reference guide for fly fishing for decades, it went through nine printings by 1896. The illustrations in the book were exhibited at the 1893 Chicago World’s Columbian Exposition.

Orvis has since published dozens of guide books, many written by fisherman Tom Rosenbauer, covering topics related to fishing, shooting, and outdoor lifestyle.

=== Company newspaper ===
In 1967, new Orvis owner Leigh Perkins started a company newspaper called The Orvis News. He hired ad executive Baird Hall to run the publication. After Hall retired, "Perk" Perkins became head of the newspaper, followed by Tom Rosenbauer. In 2010, the company launched the Orvis News website. It featured articles from experts on fly fishing, hunting, dogs, conservation, and travel, and also housed the company's podcasts.
