= Larry J. Young =

American psychiatrist (1950–2024)

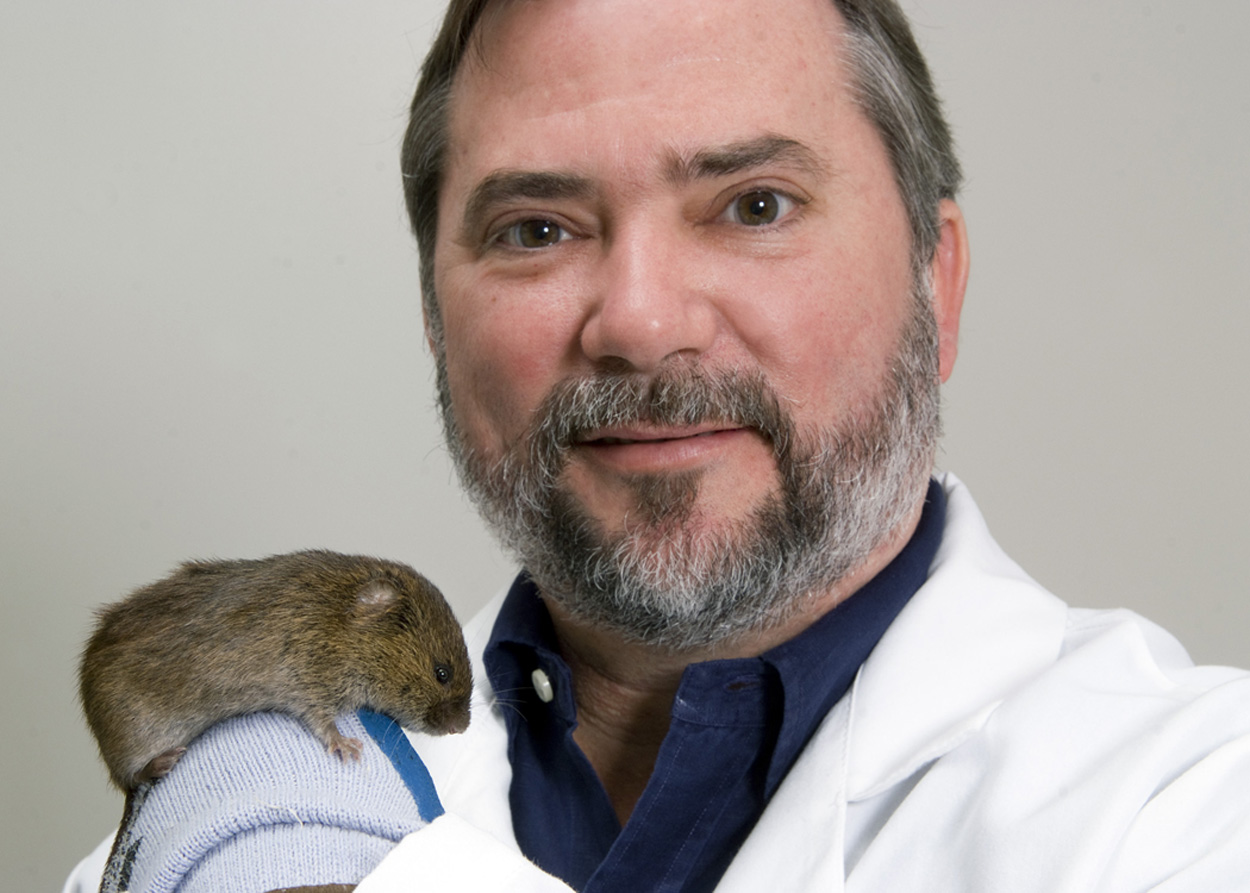
- Born: Larry James Young; June 16, 1967; Sylvester, Georgia, U.S.
- Died: March 21, 2024 (aged 56); Tsukuba, Japan
- Education: University of Georgia (BS); University of Texas (Ph.D)
- Occupation: Academic
- Known for: Translational Social Neuroscience
- Spouses: Michelle Willingham (m. 1985, divorced); Anne Murphy (m. 2002)
- Children: 3
- Website: www.larryjyoung.com

Larry James Young (June 16, 1967 – March 21, 2024) was an American psychiatrist who was the William P. Timmie Professor of Psychiatry and Behavioral Sciences at the Emory University School of Medicine. He was head of the Division of Behavioral Neuroscience and Psychiatric Disorders at Emory National Primate Research Center. Young studied how genetic, cellular and neurobiological mechanisms regulate complex social behavior, including social cognition and social bonding. His research focuses heavily on the roles of the neuropeptides oxytocin and vasopressin in regulating the neural processing of social signals and social attachment.

Young developed behavioral paradigms that are useful for screening drugs that enhance social cognition, and the development of novel strategies for drug discovery in the treatment of psychiatric disorders. Young was also the director of the Center for Translational Social Neuroscience at Emory University, which brings together scientists and clinicians in the Atlanta area who are focused on understanding and healing the human brain. Young's work has also been the subject of a National Geographic documentary.

== Early life ==
Young was born in Sylvester, Georgia, in 1967, and grew up on his family's peanut farm. Compared to the expanse of his scientific career, he had very little growing up. He kept many pets, such as a possum which he is said to have carried around on his head. Through these childhood experiences, he became interested in the biological sciences. Initially he thought of becoming a veterinarian, but then switched to medicine after discovering an interest in genetics. As an undergraduate, Young majored in Biochemistry, graduating from the University of Georgia in 1989. He went on to pursue his Ph.D at the University of Texas at Austin, graduating in 1994 with a degree in Neuroendocrinology. He completed his post-doc studies at Emory University, focusing his research on the role and influence of genes in social expression.

== Scientific work with prairie voles ==
While at Emory University, Young conducted experiments on prairie voles, to demonstrate the role that genes play in forming social bonds. Prairie voles were selected since different species have different mating strategies. Certain species of prairie voles are monogamous, an evolutionary response to environmental factors (i.e, predation, food scarcity, rearing of young). While other species of prairie voles are promiscuous, a response to a lack of evolutionary and environmental stressors. To test if these evolutionary factors were responsible for the divergence of mating strategies among prairie voles, Young altered one single gene in the promiscuous species of a prairie vole. The genetic alteration changed the mating behaviour of the prairie vole, turning a once promiscuous prairie vole, monogamous. The change in mating behaviour, while genetic in nature, was caused by an increase in the receptiveness of the prairie voles brain to the neuropeptides oxytocin and vasopressin. The results of the study generated great interest beyond the scientific community, with stories appearing in NPR and with National Geographic making a documentary on Young's work.

== Personal life and death ==
In 1985, Young married Michelle Willingham; they had three children and later divorced. He married neuroscientist Anne Murphy in 2002.

Young died of a heart attack in Tsukuba, Japan on March 21, 2024, at age 56. He had traveled to the country for a meeting of the Society for Social Neuroscience.

== Publications ==
According to Google Scholar, Young's works have been cited over 47,000 times giving him an h-index of 111. Some significant publications are:

- Young, Larry; Alexander, Brian (2012). The Chemistry Between Us: Love, Sex, and the Science of Attraction. New York: Current (Penguin Group). ISBN 978-1-59184-513-3.
- Johnson, Z. V.; Young, L. J. (2015). "Neurobiological mechanisms of social attachment and pair bonding". Current Opinion in Behavioral Sciences. 3: 38–44. doi:10.1016/j.cobeha.2015.01.009. PMC 4486624. PMID 26146650.
- McGraw, L. A.; Young, L. J. (2010). "The prairie vole: an emerging model organism for understanding the social brain". Trends in Neurosciences. 33 (2): 103–9. doi:10.1016/j.tins.2009.11.006. PMC 2822034. PMID 20005580.
- Young, L. J. (2009). "The neuroendocrinology of the social brain". Frontiers in Neuroendocrinology. 30 (4): 425–428. doi:10.1016/j.yfrne.2009.06.002. PMID 19596026. S2CID 31960688.
- Young, L. J. (2009). "Being human: love: neuroscience reveals all". Nature. 457 (7226): 148. Bibcode:2009Natur.457..148Y. doi:10.1038/457148a. PMID 19129828. S2CID 6378088.
- Nair, H. P.; Young, L. J. (2006). "Vasopressin and pair-bond formation: genes to brain to behavior". Physiology. 21 (2): 146–152. doi:10.1152/physiol.00049.2005. PMID 16565480.
- Young, L. J.; Murphy Young, A. Z.; Hammock, E. A. (2005). "Anatomy and neurochemistry of the pair bond". The Journal of Comparative Neurology. 493 (1): 51–57. doi:10.1002/cne.20771. PMID 16255009. S2CID 20453654.
- Lim, M. M.; Hammock, E. A.; Young, L. J. (2004). "The role of vasopressin in the genetic and neural regulation of monogamy". Journal of Neuroendocrinology. 16 (4): 325–332. doi:10.1111/j.0953-8194.2004.01162.x. PMID 15089970. S2CID 37876630.
- Young, L. J. (2002). "The neurobiology of social recognition, approach, and avoidance". Biological Psychiatry. 51 (1): 18–26. doi:10.1016/s0006-3223(01)01268-9. PMID 11801228. S2CID 12685282.
- Young, L. J.; Wang, Z.; Insel, T. R. (1998). "Neuroendocrine bases of monogamy". Trends in Neurosciences. 21 (2): 71–75. doi:10.1016/s0166-2236(97)01167-3. PMID 9498302. S2CID 36369169.
