= Manchester Village Historic District (Manchester, Massachusetts) =

Historic district in Massachusetts, United States

- U.S. National Register of Historic Places
- U.S. Historic district
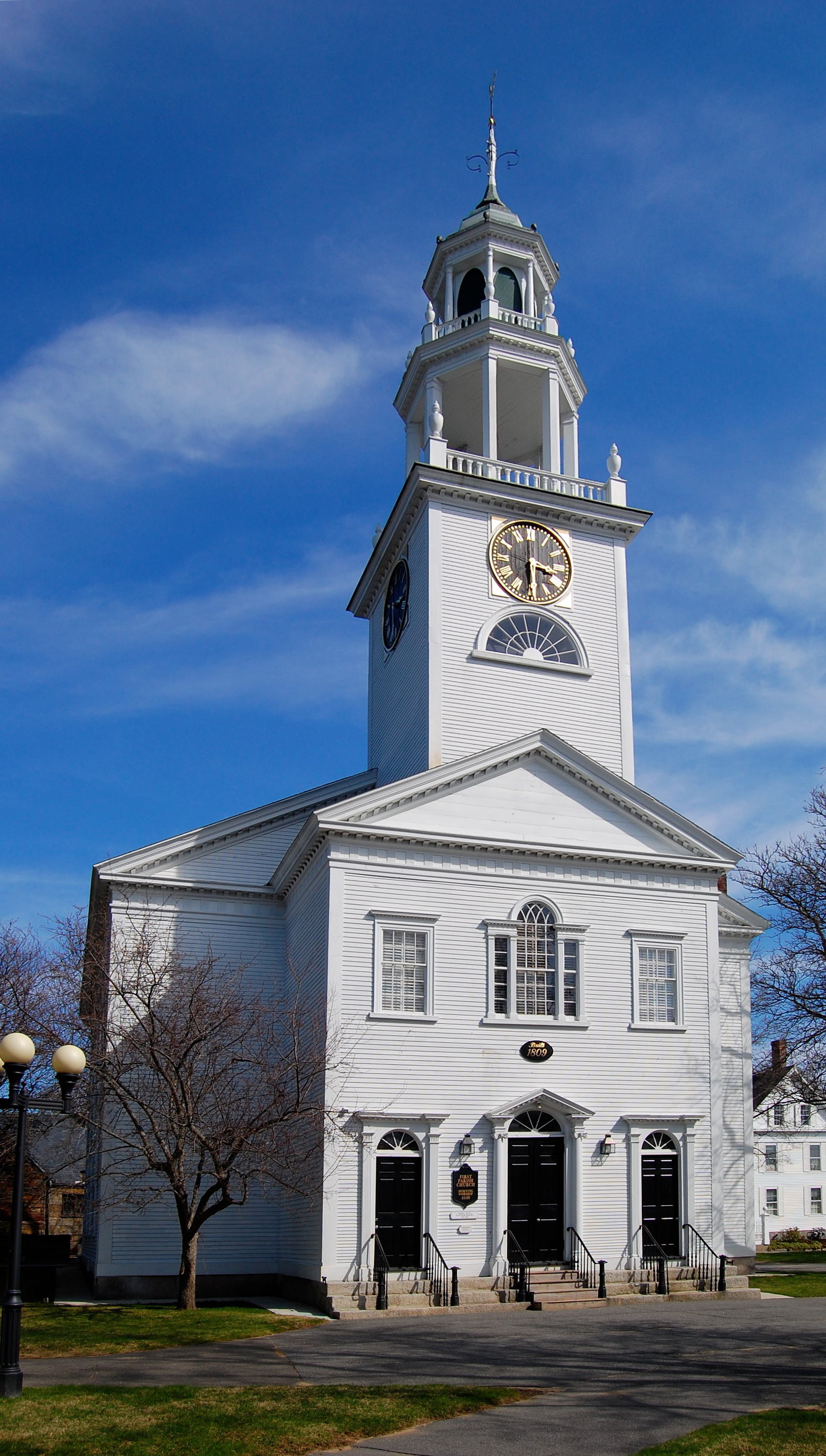
- Manchester First Parish Church

- Location within Massachusetts Location within the United States
- Location: Manchester, Massachusetts
- Coordinates: 42°34′28″N 70°46′21″W
- Area: 39 acres (16 ha)
- Architect: Multiple
- Architectural style: Late Victorian, Georgian, Federal
- NRHP reference No.: 89002156
- Added to NRHP: January 8, 1990

The Manchester Village Historic District encompasses the village center of the seaside town of Manchester-by-the-Sea, Massachusetts (formerly known as Manchester). It is stretched along Massachusetts Route 127, which runs in an arc around the northern part of Manchester Harbor, extending north on School and North Streets at the very center of the village. It is bounded on the western end roughly by Bennett Street and Ashland Avenue, and on the east by Beach Street. The village had its beginnings in the 17th century as a fishing and agrarian center, and its major roads were laid out by the late 18th century. The village was at its height in the first half of the 19th century as a fishing center, and it is from that time that most of its buildings date. Growth in the later 19th century was slower, as sea-related economic activity declined and cabinetmaking grew as a local industry.

The district was added to the National Register of Historic Places in 1990. It then included 172 contributing buildings, two contributing structures, four contributing sites and three contributing objects. With non-contributing buildings, the district has a total of 212 buildings, of which 134 are residences, of which 89 were built before 1850.

The oldest are 25 Bennett Street (before 1675), which was possibly built for Aaron Bennett and 3 North Street (c.1714), built for Benjamin Allen, an innholder. The district has 26 surviving Colonial and Georgian houses.

== See also ==
- National Register of Historic Places listings in Essex County, Massachusetts
