= Manchester (village), Vermont =

Manchester, Vermont
- Village
- Logo

- Location within the state of Vermont
- Coordinates: 43°09′40″N 73°04′16″W
- Country: United States
- State: Vermont
- County: Bennington
- Town: Manchester

Area
  - Total: 3.56 sq mi (9.23 km^{2})
  - Land: 3.54 sq mi (9.16 km^{2})
  - Water: 0.027 sq mi (0.07 km^{2})
- Elevation: 883 ft (269 m)

Population (2020)
  - Total: 783
  - Density: 221/sq mi (85.5/km^{2})
- Time zone: UTC-5 (Eastern (EST))
  - Summer (DST): UTC-4 (EDT)
- ZIP code: 05254
- Area code: 802
- FIPS code: 50-42700
- GNIS feature ID: 2378314
- Website: villageofmanchester.com
- Manchester Village Historic District
- U.S. National Register of Historic Places
- U.S. Historic district
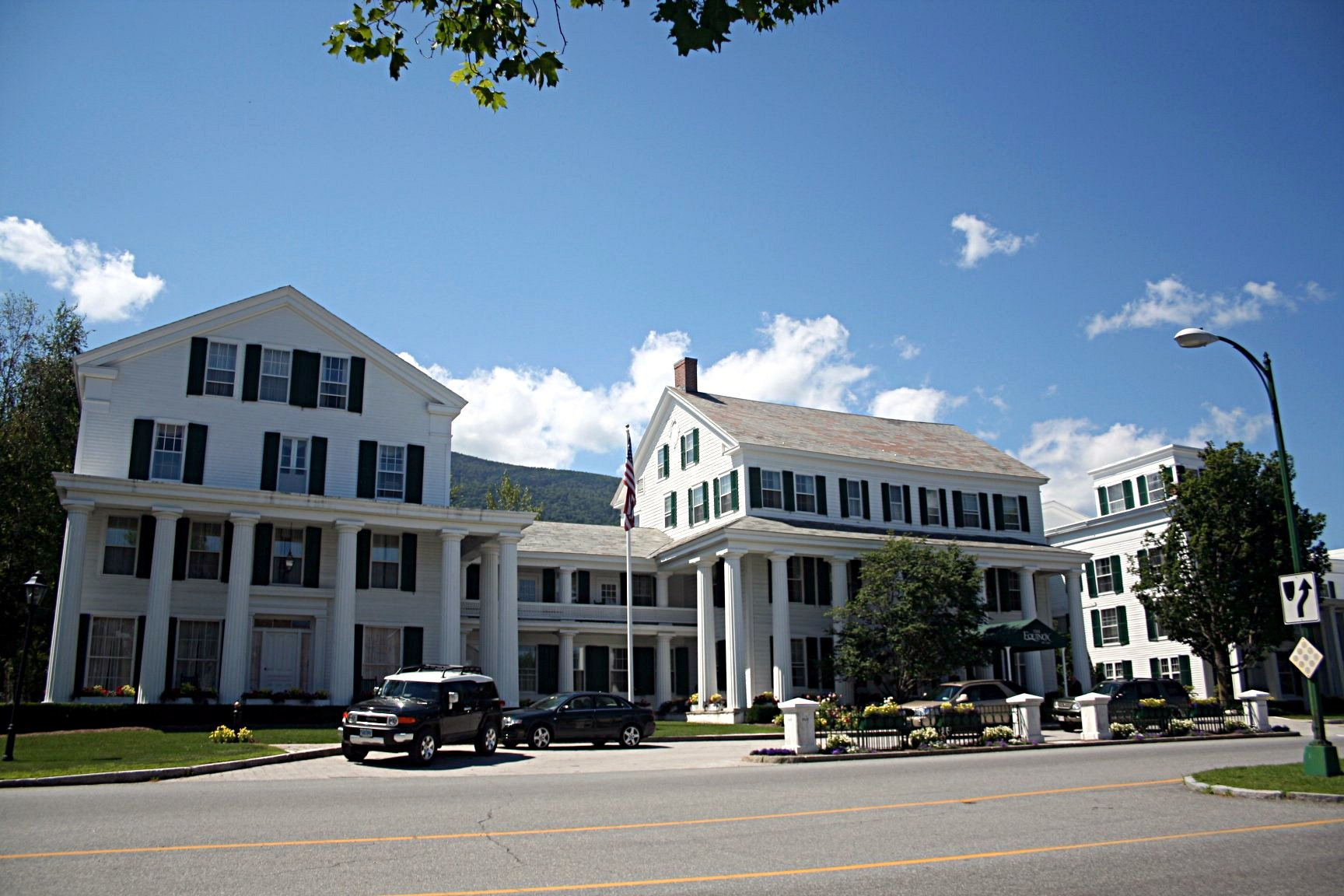
- The Equinox Hotel in Manchester
- Location: VT 7A, Union St., and Taconic Ave., Manchester, Vermont
- Coordinates: 43°9′38″N 73°4′22″W
- Area: 90 acres (36 ha)
- Architectural style: Colonial, Federal, Greek Revival
- NRHP reference No.: 84003438
- Added to NRHP: January 26, 1984

Manchester is an incorporated village in the town of Manchester, Bennington County, Vermont, United States. The population was 783 at the 2020 census.

The village center, located in the vicinity of Vermont Route 7A, Union Street and Taconic Avenue, was added to the National Register of Historic Places as Manchester Village Historic District in 1984. The district includes 65 contributing and 19 non-contributing properties spread over an area of 90 acres (360,000 m^{2}). The centerpiece of the district is the Equinox House, which is listed separately on the National Register.

== History ==
Manchester Village was first settled in 1761. Through the middle of the 19th century, Manchester was primarily a crossroads village and the site of several taverns and inns. The village's first inn was built in 1769 on the property that is now the site of the Equinox House. Settlement was slow until after the American Revolutionary War, when the area received an influx of settlers, as Vermont temporarily became the fastest growing U.S. state. In the 19th century, the village was overtaken in economic importance by the growth of Manchester Center, and the village was developed and promoted by Charles F. Orvis (founder of the Orvis mail-order business, still based in Manchester) as a summer resort destination for New Yorkers. The village is one of the first places in New England that was promoted and developed as a summer resort community.

== Geography ==
Manchester Village is located on the banks of the Batten Kill in the north–south trending valley between the Green Mountains on the east and the Taconics on the west. Vermont Route 7A runs north–south through the village, and the Batten Kill forms its eastern boundary. According to the United States Census Bureau, the village has a total area of 3.58 square miles (9.26 km^{2}), of which 3.54 square miles (9.18 km^{2}) is land and 0.031 square miles (0.08 km^{2}), or 0.85%, is water.

== Demographics ==
Historical population
Census	Pop.	Note	%±
1910	478		—
1920	423		−11.5%
1930	337		−20.3%
1940	325		−3.6%
1950	454		39.7%
1960	403		−11.2%
1970	435		7.9%
1980	563		29.4%
1990	561		−0.4%
2000	602		7.3%
2010	749		24.4%
2020	783		4.5%
U.S. Decennial Census

As of the census of 2000, there were 602 people, 284 households, and 170 families residing in the village. The population density was 168.1 people per square mile (64.9/km^{2}). There were 483 housing units at an average density of 134.9/sq mi (52.1/km^{2}). The racial makeup of the village was 98.50% White, 0.17% Black or African American, 0.33% Asian, 0.66% from other races, and 0.33% from two or more races. Hispanic or Latino of any race were 1.99% of the population.

There were 284 households, out of which 20.8% had children under the age of 18 living with them, 54.2% were married couples living together, 4.9% had a female householder with no husband present, and 39.8% were non-families. 35.2% of all households were made up of individuals, and 23.9% had someone living alone who was 65 years of age or older. The average household size was 2.12 and the average family size was 2.70.

In the village, the population was spread out, with 19.3% under the age of 18, 3.3% from 18 to 24, 16.6% from 25 to 44, 32.2% from 45 to 64, and 28.6% who were 65 years of age or older. The median age was 52 years. For every 100 females, there were 83.5 males. For every 100 females age 18 and over, there were 80.0 males.

The median income for a household in the village was $57,321, and the median income for a family was $92,044. Males had a median income of $60,469 versus $22,250 for females. The per capita income for the village was $40,851. None of the families and 5.0% of the population were living below the poverty line, including no under eighteens and 11.6% of those over 64.

== Points of interest ==
- Dellwood Cemetery
- Equinox House Historic District

== See also ==
- National Register of Historic Places listings in Bennington County, Vermont
