= National Outdoor Book Award =

American annual literary awards

- Awarded for: The best in outdoor writing and publishing.
- Date: Annual
- Country: United States
- First award: 1997
- Website: http://www.noba-web.org

The National Outdoor Book Award (NOBA) was formed in 1997 as an American-based non-profit program which each year presents awards honoring the best in outdoor writing and publishing. It is housed at Idaho State University and chaired by Ron Watters. It is sponsored by the National Outdoor Book Awards Foundation, Idaho State University and the Association of Outdoor Recreation and Education. As of 2021, awards have been presented in 13 categories, although not all categories are awarded in any given year.

The award is announced in early November of each year. Winning books are promoted nationally and are entitled to display the National Outdoor Book Award gold medallion.

== Winners and honorable mentions (silver medals) ==
- Small date (2010 vs 2010 ) = Honorable Mention or Silver Medal (Starting in 2021, "Silver medals" replaced honorable mentions. They are awarded when the two top books in a category score within a slim margin of each other. Ties are also sometimes awarded.)

=== Outdoor literature (non-fiction) ===
- 1997: Don Gayton, Landscapes of the Interior: Re-Explorations of Nature and the Human Spirit
- 1997: W. Scott Olsen and Scott Cairns, The Sacred Place: Witnessing the Holy in the Physical World
- 1998: Greg Child, Postcards from the Ledge: Collected Mountaineering Writings of Greg Child
- 1999: Richard Bangs, The Lost River: A Memoir of Life, Death, and Transformation on Wild Water
- 2000: Chris Duff, On Celtic Tides: One Man's Journey Around Ireland by Sea Kayak
- 2001: Erika Warmbrunn, Where the Pavement Ends: One Woman's Bicycle Trip Through Mongolia, China and Vietnam
- 2002: Jill Fredston, Rowing to Latitude: Journeys Along the Arctic's Edge
- 2003: Joe Simpson, The Beckoning Silence
- 2004: Maria Coffey, Where the Mountain Casts Its Shadow: The Dark Side of Extreme Adventure
- 2004: Ted Kerasote, Out There: In the Wild in a Wired Age
- 2004: Angela & Duffy Ballard, A Blistered Kind of Love: One Couple's Trial by Trail
- 2005: Jennifer Jordan, Savage Summit: The True Stories of the First Five Women Who Climbed K2, the World's Most Feared Mountain
- 2005: Peter Stark, At the Mercy of the River: An Exploration of the Last African Wilderness
- 2006: Karsten Heuer, Being Caribou: Five Months on Foot with a Caribou Herd
- 2007: Lou Ureneck, Backcast: Fatherhood, Fly-fishing, and a River Journey Through the Heart of Alaska
- 2007: Beth A. Leonard, Blue Horizons: Dispatches from Distant Seas
- 2008: Jennifer Lowe-Anker, Forget Me Not: A Memoir
- 2009: Mark Obmascik, Halfway to Heaven: My White-knuckled--and Knuckleheaded--Quest for the Rocky Mountain High
- 2009: Julie Angus, Rowboat in a Hurricane: My Amazing Journey Across a Changing Ocean
- 2010: Peter Heller, Kook: What Surfing Taught Me About Love, Life and Catching the Perfect Wave
- 2010: Winton Porter, Just Passin' Thru: A Vintage Store, the Appalachian Trail, and a Cast of Unforgettable Characters
- 2011: Philip Connors, Fire Season: Field Notes from a Wilderness Lookout
- 2012: Suzanne Roberts, Almost Somewhere: Twenty-Eight Days on the John Muir Trail
- 2012: Jim Davidson and Kevin Vaughan, The Ledge: An Adventure Story of Friendship and Survival on Mount Rainier
- 2012: Michael Lanza, Before They're Gone: A Family's Year-Long Quest to Explore America's Most Endangered National Parks
- 2013: Gail D. Storey, I Promise Not to Suffer: A Fool for Love Hikes the Pacific Crest Trail
- 2013: Dylan Tomine, Closer to the Ground: An Outdoor Family’s Year on the Water, in the Woods and at the Table
- 2014: Erin McKittrick, Small Feet, Big Land: Adventure, Home and Family on the Edge of Alaska
- 2015: Jennifer Kingsley, Paddlenorth: Adventure, Resilience and Renewal in the Arctic Wild
- 2015: Kelly Cordes, The Tower: A Chronicle of Climbing and Controversy on Cerro Torre
- 2016: Debbie Clarke Moderow, Fast Into the Night: A Woman, Her Dogs, and Their Journey North on the Iditarod Trail
- 2016: Sue Leaf, Portage: A Family, a Canoe and the Search for the Good Life
- 2017: John Gierach, A Fly Rod of Your Own
- 2017: Robert Moor, On Trails: An Exploration
- 2017: Erik Weihenmayer and Buddy Levy, No Barriers: A Blind Man's Journey to Kayak the Grand Canyon
- 2018: Annette McGivney, Pure Land: A True Story of Three Lives and the Search for Heaven on Earth
- 2019: Geoff Power, Inner Ranges: An Anthology of Mountain Thoughts
- 2019: Dave Shively The Pacific Alone: The Untold Story of Kayaking's Boldest Voyage
- 2019: Raynor Winn, The Salt Path
- 2020: Edward Power, Dragons in the Snow: Avalanche Detectives and the Race to Beat Death in the Mountains
- 2021: Trina Moyles, Lookout: Love, Solitude and Searching for Wildfire in the Boreal Forest
- 2021: Mark Kurlansky, The Unreasonable Virtue of Fly Fishing
- 2021: Sara Dykman, Bicycling with Butterflies: My 10,201 Mile Journey Following the Monarch Migration
- 2022: Doug Peacock Was it Worth It? A Wilderness Warrior’s Long Trail Home
- 2022: Dylan Tomine, Headwaters: The Adventures, Obsession, and Evolution of a Fly Fisherman
- 2023: Darrell Hartman, Battle of Ink and Ice: A Sensational Story of News Barons, North Pole Explorers, and the Making of Modern Media
- 2023: Jennifer Ackerman, What an Owl Knows: The New Science of the World’s Most Enigmatic Birds
- 2024: Kevin Fedarko, A Walk in the Park: The True Story of a Spectacular Misadventure in the Grand Canyon
- 2024: Richard J. King, Sailing Alone: A Surprising History of Isolation and Survival at Sea
- 2025: Sophie Elmhirst, A Marriage at Sea: A True Story of Love, Obsession and Shipwreck

=== Outdoor literature (fiction) ===
- 2015: Kim Heacox, Jimmy Bluefeather: A Novel
- 2022: Amy McCulloch, Breathless: A Thriller

=== Journeys ===
- 2021: Anders Morley, This Land of Snow: A Journey Across the North in Winter
- 2021: Karen Berger, photographs by Bart Smith, America's Great Historic Trails: Walking the Trails of History
- 2022: Marina Richie, Halcyon Journey: In Search of the Belted Kingfisher
- 2023: Michael Wejchert, Hidden Mountains: Survival and Reckoning After a Climb Gone Wrong
- 2024: Adam Shoalts, Where the Falcon Flies: A 3,400 Kilometre Odyssey from my Doorstep to the Arctic
- 2024: Michael Engelhard, Arctic Traverse: A Thousand-Mile Summer of Trekking the Brooks Range
- 2025: John Turner, Killing the Buddha on the Appalachian Trail: Walking On Through Self-doubt and Aging
- 2025: Ben Weissenbach, North to the Future: An Offline Adventure Through the Changing Wilds of Alaska

=== History/biography ===
- 1997: [no award]
- 1998: Vince Welch, Cort Conley and Brad Dimock, The Doing of the Thing: The Brief, Brilliant Whitewater Career of Buzz Holmstrom
- 1999: Sam Keith from the journals and photographs of Richard Proenneke, One Man's Wilderness: An Alaskan Odyssey
- 2000: Peter & Leni Gillman, The Wildest Dream: The Biography of George Mallory
- 2001: Donald Worster, A River Running West: The Life of John Wesley Powell
- 2001: Brad Dimock, Sunk Without a Sound: The Tragic Colorado Honeymoon of Glen and Bessie Hyde
- 2002: Char Miller, Gifford Pinchot and the Making of Modern Environmentalism
- 2002: Jonathan Waterman, Arctic Crossing: One Man's 2,200 Mile Odyssey Among the Inuit
- 2003: Chris Duff, Southern Exposure: A Solo Sea Kayaking Journey Around New Zealand's South Island
- 2003: Rebecca A. Brown, Women on High: Pioneers of Mountaineering
- 2004: Andy Selters, Ways to the Sky: A Historical Guide to North American Mountaineering
- 2005: Neal Petersen with William P. Baldwin and Patty Fulcher, Journey of a Hope Merchant: From Apartheid to the Elite World of Solo Yacht Racing
- 2005: Arlene Blum, Breaking Trail: A Climbing Life
- 2006: Eric Blehm, The Last Season
- 2007: Brad Dimock, The Very Hard Way: Bert Loper and the Colorado River
- 2007: James M. Tabor, Forever on the Mountain: The Truth Behind One of Mountaineering's Most Controversial and Mysterious Disasters
- 2008: Maurice Isserman and Stewart Weaver, Fallen Giants: A History of Himalayan Mountaineering from the Age of Empire to the Age of Extremes
- 2008: Elias Butler and Tom Myers, Grand Obsession: Harvey Butchart and the Exploration of the Grand Canyon
- 2009: Douglas Brinkley, Wilderness Warrior: Theodore Roosevelt and the Crusade for America
- 2010: Joseph E. Taylor III, Pilgrims of the Vertical: Yosemite Rock Climbers & Nature at Risk
- 2010: Jennifer Jordan, The Last Man on the Mountain: The Death of an American Adventurer on K2
- 2010: Glyn Williams, Arctic Labyrinth: The Quest for the Northwest Passage
- 2011: Dominic Gill, Take a Seat: One Man, One Tandem and Twenty Thousand Miles of Possibilities
- 2011: Edward J. Larson, An Empire of Ice: Scott, Shackleton, and the Heroic Age of Antarctic Science
- 2012: Peter Zuckerman and Amanda Padoan, Buried in the Sky: The Extraordinary Story of the Sherpa Climbers on K2's Deadliest Day
- 2012: Jo Deurbrouck, Anything Worth Doing: A True Story of Adventure, Friendship and Tragedy on the Last of the West's Great Rivers
- 2013: Kevin Fedarko, The Emerald Mile: The Epic Story of the Fastest Ride in History Through the Heart of the Grand Canyon
- 2014: Ben Montgomery, Grandma Gatewood's Walk: The Inspiring Story of the Woman Who Saved the Appalachian Trail
- 2015: Sean Prentiss, Finding Abbey: The Search for Edward Abbey and His Hidden Desert Grave
- 2016: Mick Conefrey, The Ghosts of K2: The Epic Saga of the First Ascent
- 2016: Maurice Isserman, Continental Divide: A History of American Mountaineering
- 2016: Glen Denny, Valley Walls: A Memoir of Climbing & Living in Yosemite
- 2017: Bernadette McDonald, Art of Freedom: The Life and Climbs of Voytek Kurtyka
- 2018: Edward J. Larson, To the Edges of the Earth: 1909, the Race for the Three Poles
- 2018: Max McCoy, Elevations: A Personal Exploration of the Arkansas River
- 2019: Julie Hauserman: Drawn to the Deep: The Remarkable Underwater Explorations of Wes Skiles
- 2019: John Taliaferro, Grinnell: America's Environmental Pioneer and his Restless Drive to Save the West
- 2020: Scott Ellsworth, The World Beneath Their Feet: Mountaineering Madness and the Deadly Race to Summit the Himalayas
- 2020: Buddy Levy, Labyrinth of Ice: The Triumphant and Tragic Greely Polar Expedition
- 2021: Jennifer Hull, Shook: An Earthquake, a Legendary Mountain Guide, and Everest’s Deadliest Day
- 2022: Rick Ridgeway, A Life Lived Wild: Adventures at the Edge of the Map
- 2022: Lowell Skoog, Written in the Snows: Across Time on Skis in the Pacific Northwest
- 2023: Melissa L. Sevigny, Brave the Wild River: The Untold Story of Two Women Who Mapped the Botany of the Grand Canyon
- 2023: Buddy Levy, Empire of Ice and Stone: The Disastrous and Heroic Voyage of the Karluk
- 2024: Geoff Powter, Winner. Survival is Not Assured: The Life of Climber Jim Donini.
- 2024: Bernadette McDonald, Alpine Rising: Sherpas, Baltis, and the Triumph of Local Climbers in the Greater Ranges
- 2025: Diane K. Boyd, A Woman Among Wolves: My Journey Through Forty Years of Wolf Recovery
- 2025: Daniel Light, The White Ladder: Triumph and Tragedy at the Dawn of Mountaineering

=== Outdoor classic ===
- 1997: [no award]
- 1998: Don Graydon and Kurt Hanson, Mountaineering: The Freedom of the Hills
- 1998: Margaret Murie, Two in the Far North
- 1999: John J. Rowlands, Henry B. Kane (illus.), Cache Lake Country: Life in the North Woods
- 2000: Aldo Leopold, A Sand County Almanac
- 2001: Roderick Nash, Wilderness and the American Mind
- 2002: Laura Waterman and Guy Waterman, Backwoods Ethics: A Guide to Low-Impact Camping and Hiking
- 2003: Richard E. Byrd, Alone
- 2004: Henry David Thoreau, Jeffrey S. Cramer (ed.), Walden
- 2005: Lifetime Achievement Recognition: Farley Mowat for Sea of Slaughter, Never Cry Wolf and other works.
- 2006: P. G. Downes, Sleeping Island: A Journey to the Edge of the Barrens
- 2007: Donald Culross Peattie, A Natural History of North American Trees
- 2008: Thomas Winnett, Ben Schifrin, Jeffrey Schaffer, Ruby Johnson Jenkins and Andy Selters, Pacific Crest Trail (series). In three volumes: Southern California, Northern California and Oregon & Washington
- 2008: Ellsworth L. Kolb, Through the Grand Canyon from Wyoming to Mexico
- 2009: William Nealy, Kayak: The New Frontier
- 2009: Steve Sherman and Julia Older, Appalachian Odyssey: Walking the Trail from Georgia to Maine
- 2010: Maurice Herzog, Annapurna: First Conquest of an 8,000-Meter Peak
- 2011: Lifetime Achievement Recognition: John Muir for My First Summer in the Sierra and other works.
- 2012: [no award]
- 2013: Thomas Hornbein, Everest: The West Ridge
- 2014: Nicholas Howe, Not Without Peril: 150 Years of Misadventure on the Presidential Range of New Hampshire
- 2015: Ernest Thompson Seton, Wahb: The Biography of a Grizzly
- 2016: Michael P. Ghiglieri and Thomas M. Myers, Over the Edge: Death in Grand Canyon
- 2017: Kenn Kaufman, Kingbird Highway: The Biggest Year in the Life of an Extreme Birder
- 2018: Claudia Pearson (editor), Mike Clelland (illus.), NOLS Cookery
- 2019: Mark Elbroch and Casey McFarland, Mammal Tracks and Sign: A Guide to North American Species
- 2020: Kim Heacox, The Only Kayak: A Journey Into the Heart of Alaska
- 2021: Elizabeth Wenk and Mike White, Sierra South / Sierra North
- 2022: Steve Roper, Camp 4: Recollections of a Yosemite Rockclimber
- 2023: Thomas F. Hornbein, Everest: The West Ridge
- 2024: Art Davidson, Minus 148: First Winter Ascent of Mount McKinley.
- 2025: Reinhold Messner, The Crystal Horizon: Everest – The First Solo Ascent

=== Nature and the environment ===
- 1997: [no award]
- 1998: Tim Palmer, The Columbia: Sustaining a Modern Resource
- 1998: L. David Mech, The Arctic Wolf: Ten Years with the Pack
- 1999: Tim McNulty, Pat O'Hara (photographs), Washington's Mount Rainier National Park: A Centennial Celebration
- 1999: Phillip Manning, Islands of Hope: Lessons from North America's Great Wildlife Sanctuaries
- 2000: Terry Grosz, Wildlife Wars: The Life and Times of a Fish and Game Warden
- 2000: Kevin Schafer, Penguin Planet: Their World, Our World
- 2001: Andrew Beattie and Paul R. Ehrlich, Wild Solutions: How Biodiversity is Money in the Bank
- 2001: Terry Grosz, For Love of Wildness: The Journal of a U.S. Game Management Agent
- 2001: Douglas Steakley, Ric Masten (poetry), Pacific Light: Images of the Monterey Peninsula
- 2002: Ted Steinberg, Down to Earth: Nature's Role in American History
- 2002: Alexandra Morton, Listening to Whales: What the Orcas Have Taught Us
- 2002: Thomas Wiewandt and Maureen Wilks, The Southwest Inside Out: An Illustrated Guide to the Land and Its History
- 2003: Gregory S. Stone, Ice Island: Expedition to Antarctica's Largest Iceberg
- 2004: Kenneth G. Libbrecht, Patricia Rasmussen (photography), The Snowflake: Winter's Secret Beauty
- 2005: James R. Spotila, Sea Turtles: A Complete Guide to Their Biology, Behavior, and Conservation
- 2006: David Attenborough, Life in the Underground
- 2006: David Zurick and Julsun Pacheco, Illustrated Atlas of the Himalaya
- 2006: Wayne Ranney, Carving Grand Canyon: Evidence, Theories, and Mystery
- 2007: Sophie A. H. Osborn, Condors in Canyon Country: The Return of the California Condor to the Grand Canyon Region
- 2007: Francis Latreille, White Paradise: Journeys to the North Pole
- 2008: Steven Kazlowski, The Last Polar Bear: Facing the Truth of a Warming World
- 2008: Wayne Grady, The Great Lakes: The Natural History of a Changing Region
- 2009: Yann Arthus-Bertrand, Our Living Earth
- 2009: Michael Welland, Sand: The Never Ending Story
- 2010: Mark W. Moffett, Adventures Among Ants: A Global Safari With a Cast of Trillions
- 2011: Nancy Ross Hugo, Robert Llewellyn (photo), Seeing Trees: Discover the Extraordinary Secrets of Everyday Trees
- 2012: Michael Collier, The Melting Edge: Alaska at the Frontier of Climate Change
- 2012: Carol Gracie, Spring Wildflowers of the Northeast: A Natural History
- 2012: Andrew E. Derocher, Wayne Lynch (photo), Polar Bears: A Complete Guide to Their Biology and Behavior
- 2013: Krista Schlyer, Continental Divide: Wildlife, People and the Border Wall
- 2013: Nancy Bauer, The California Wildlife Habitat Garden: How to Attract Bees, Butterflies, Birds and Other Animals
- 2013: David Moskowitz, Wolves in the Land of Salmon
- 2014: Bruce L. Smith, Life on the Rocks: A Portrait of the American Mountain Goat
- 2014: Stan Tekiela, Feathers: A Beautiful Look at a Bird's Most Unique Feature
- 2015: Tony Angell, The House of Owls
- 2015: Noah Wilson-Rich, The Bee: A Natural History
- 2015: Errol Fuller, The Passenger Pigeon
- 2016: Lori Weidenhammer, Victory Gardens for Bees: A DIY Guide to Saving the Bees
- 2017: Anurag Agrawal, Monarchs and Milkweed
- 2017: Günther Bloch, The Pipestone Wolves: The Rise and Fall of a Wolf Family
- 2018: Alvin R. Breisch, Matt Patterson (illus.), The Snake and the Salamander: Reptiles and Amphibians from Maine to Virginia
- 2019: Krista Schlyer, River of Redemption: Almanac of Life on the Anacostia
- 2020: David A. Steen, Secrets of Snakes: The Science Beyond the Myths.
- 2020: Tim Palmer, America's Great Mountain Trails: 100 Highcountry Hikes of a Lifetime
- 2021: Lynda V. Mapes, Orca: Shared Waters, Shared Home
- 2022: Pete McBride, Seeing the Silence: The Beauty of the World’s Most Quiet Places
- 2023: Eric Lee-Mäder, Beverly Duncan (illus.), The Milkweed Lands: An Epic Story of One Plant Its Nature and Ecology
- 2023: Dave Showalter, Living River: The Promise of the Mighty Colorado
- 2024: Amy Stewart, The Tree Collectors: Tales of Arboreal Obsession
- 2025: Bruce A. Bugbee, Robert J. Kiesling, John B. Wright, Kevin League (photographs), Saving the Big Sky: A Chronicle of Land Conservation in Montana
- 2025: Michael Forsberg, Into Whooperland: A Photographer's Journey with Whooping Cranes
- 2025: Dudley Edmondson, People the Planet Needs Now: Voices for Justice, Science, and a Future of Promise

=== Natural history literature ===
- 1997-2004: [no award]
- 2005: Alan Burdick, Out of Eden: An Odyssey of Ecological Invasion
- 2006: John Nielsen, Condor: To the Brink and Back
- 2007: Robert Michael Pyle, Sky Time in Gray's River: Living for Keeps in a Forgotten Place
- 2007: Michael Punke, Last Stand: George Bird Grinnell, the Battle to Save the Buffalo, and the Birth of the New West
- 2008: Susan Freinkel, The American Chestnut: The Life, Death, and Rebirth of a Perfect Tree
- 2009: Rob Dunn, Every Living Thing: Man's Obsessive Quest to Catalog Life, from Nanobacteria to New Monkeys
- 2010: Anders Halverson, An Entirely Synthetic Fish: How Rainbow Trout Beguiled America and Overran the World
- 2010: Elisabeth Tova Bailey, The Sound of a Wild Snail Eating
- 2011: Bill Belleville, Salvaging the Real Florida: Lost and Found in the State of Dreams
- 2012: David George Haskell, The Forest Unseen: A Year's Watch in Nature
- 2013: Aarin Hirsh, Telling Our Way to the Sea: A Voyage of Discovery in the Sea of Cortez
- 2013: Akiko Busch, The Incidental Steward: Reflections on Citizen Science
- 2014: Julian Hoffman, The Small Heart of Things: Being at Home in a Beckoning World
- 2015: Diane Ackerman, The Human Age: The World Shaped By Us
- 2015: Helen Macdonald, H is for Hawk
- 2016: Drew Harvell, A Sea of Glass: Searching for the Blaschkas’ Fragile Legacy in an Ocean at Risk
- 2017: Jonathan White, Tides: The Science and Spirit of the Ocean
- 2018: Bernd Heinrich, A Naturalist at Large: The Best Essays of Bernd Heinrich
- 2018: Elizabeth Rush, Rising: Dispatches from the New American Shore
- 2019: Peter Wohlleben, The Secret Wisdom of Nature: Trees, Animals, and All Living Things
- 2019: Robert Macfarlane, Underland: A Deep Time Journey
- 2019: Christopher Ketcham, This Land: How Cowboys, Capitalism, are Ruining the American West
- 2020: Patrik Svensson, The Book of Eels: Our Enduring Fascination with the Most Mysterious Creature in the Natural World
- 2021: Suzanne Simard, Finding the Mother Tree: Discovering the Wisdom of the Forest
- 2021: Jonathan Balcombe, Super Fly: The Unexpected Lives of the World’s Most Successful Insects
- 2021: Helen Macdonald, Vesper Flights
- 2022: Seth Kantner, A Thousand Trails Home: Living with Caribou
- 2023: Dan Flores, Wild New World: The Epic Story of Animals & People in America
- 2023: Hanne Strager, Paul Nicklen (photography), The Killer Whale Journals: Our Love and Fear of Orcas
- 2024: Zoë Schlanger, The Light Eaters: How the Unseen World of Plant Intelligence Offers a New Understanding of Life on Earth
- 2024: Rick Bass, With Every Great Breath: New and Selected Essays 1995-2023
- 2025: M. L. Herring, Born of Fire and Rain: Journey into a Pacific Coastal Forest

=== Children's ===
- 1997: [no award]
- 1998: [no award]
- 1999: Mary Wallace, The Inuksuk Book
- 2000: Twig C. George, Jellies: The Life of Jellyfish
- 2000: Ann Dixon, Evon Zerbetz (illus.), Blueberry Shoe
- 2001: Nancy White Carlstrom, Tim Ladwig (illus.), What Does the Sky Say?
- 2001: Bruce Hiscock, Coyote and Badger: Desert Hunters of the Southwest
- 2002: Jane Yolen, Jason Stemple (photos), Wild Wings: Poems for Young People
- 2002: Mia Posada, Ladybugs: Red, Fiery and Bright
- 2003: Gloria Whelan, Gijsbert van Frankenhuyzen (illus.), Jam & Jelly by Holly & Nellie
- 2003: Ellen Stoll Walsh, Dot and Jabber and the Big Bug Mystery
- 2004: Mary Ann Hoberman, Jane Dyer (illus.), Whose Garden Is It?
- 2005: Sharon Lovejoy, The Little Green Island with a Little Red House: A Book of Colors and Critters
- 2005: Lois Ehlert, The Leaf Man
- 2006: Robbyn Smith van Frankenhuysen, Gijsbert van Frankenhuysen (illus.), Kelly of Hazel Ridge
- 2006: Lee Welles, Gaia Girls Enter the Earth
- 2007: Roland Smith, Peak
- 2008: Eric Walters, The Pole
- 2009: Laura Goering, Whistling Wings
- 2009: S. Terrell French, Operation Redwood
- 2010: Ginger Wadsworth, Karen Dugan (illus.), Camping With the President
- 2010: Mary Morton Cowan, Captain Mac: The Life of Donald Baxter MacMillan, Arctic Explorer
- 2011: Nikki McClure, To Market, To Market
- 2011: Judy Burris and Wayne Richards, The Secret Lives of Backyard Bugs
- 2012: Peggy Thomas, Laura Jacques (illus.), For the Birds: The Life of Roger Tory Peterson
- 2013: Patti Wheeler and Keith Hemstreet, Travels with Gannon and Wyatt: Botswana
- 2013: Stacy Tornio and Ken Keffer, The Kid's Outdoor Adventure Book: 448 Great Things to Do in Nature Before You Grow Up
- 2014: Elizabeth S. Varnai, Kate Hartley (illus.), Good Morning Loon
- 2015: Nancy Plain, This Strange Wilderness: The Life and Art of John James Audubon
- 2016: Sharon Mentyka, Chasing at the Surface: A Novel
- 2016: Mary Casanova, Wake Up, Island
- 2017: Jonathan London, Sean London (illus.), Pup the Sea Otter
- 2017: Monica Russo, Kevin Byron (photos), Treecology: 30 Activities and Observations for Exploring the World of Trees and Forests
- 2018: Wendy Gorton, Oregon & Washington 50 Hikes With Kids
- 2018: Rob Bierregaard, Kate Garchinsky (illus.), Belle's Journey: An Osprey Takes Flight
- 2018: Stan Tekiela, Elleyna Ruud (illus.), The Kid’s Guide to Birds of Minnesota
- 2019: Stacy Tornio, Jack Tornio, 101 Outdoor Adventures to Have Before You Grow Up
- 2019: Julie Bertagna, William Goldsmith (illus.), Wildheart: The Daring Adventures of John Muir
- 2019: Phyllis Root, The Lost Forest
- 2020: Monica Wiedel-Lubinski and Karen Madigan: Nature Play Workshop for Families: A Guide to 40+ Outdoor Learning Experiences in All Seasons
- 2021: Matt Ritter, Nayl Gonzalez (illus.), Something Wonderful
- 2022: Susan Ewing, Evon Zerbetz (illus.), Alaska is for the Birds! Fourteen Favorite Feathered Friends
- 2023: Becky Cushing Gop, Carrie Shryock (illus.), What Goes On Inside a Beaver Pond?
- 2024: Daisy Yuhas, Kids Field Guide to Birds
- 2024: Dan Armitage, Let’s Learn to Fish, Everything You Need to Know to Start Freshwater Fishing
- 2025: Diana Schaffter, Armando & the Amazing Animal Race
- 2025: Susie Spikol, Renia Metallinou (illus.), Forest Magic for Kids: How to Find Fairies, Make a Secret Fort, and Cook Up an Elfin Picnic

=== Design and artistic merit ===
- 1997: Darcy Williamson, Larry Milligan (cover art), Teresa Sales (design), The Rocky Mountain Foods Cookbook
- 1998: Maurice Hornocker, Andy Lewis (art dir.), Tom Lewis (design), Track of the Tiger
- 1998: Ira Spring, Harvey Manning, Jennifer Shontz (graphics), Marge Mueller (cartography), 100 Classic Hikes in Washington
- 1999: Leonard Adkins, Joe Cook and Monica Cook (photo), Grant M. Tatum (director), Wildflowers of the Appalachian Trail
- 1999: Hanneke Ippisch, Hedvig Rappe-Flowers (illus.), Kim Ericsson (design), Kathleen Ort (ed.), Spotted Bear: A Rocky Mountain Folktale
- 2000: Bradford Washburn (photo), Antony Decaneas (ed.), Bradford Washburn: Mountain Photography
- 2001: Art Wolfe, The Living Wild
- 2002: Stephen Kirkpatrick (photo), Marlo Carter Kirkpatrick (text), Heidi Flynn Allen (design), Wilder Mississippi
- 2002: Craig Childs, Mary Winkelman Velgos (design), Peter Ensenberger (photo), The Southwest's Contrary Land: Forever Changing Between Four Corners and the Sea of Cortes
- 2003: Tom Blagden, Jr. (photo), Charles R. Tyson, Jr., First Light: Acadia National Park and Maine's Mount Desert Island
- 2004: Michael Collier (photo), Rose Houk (text), Mary Winkelmann Velgos (design), The Mountains Know Arizona
- 2004: Art Wolfe (photo), Art Davidson, Edge of the Earth, Corner of the Sky
- 2005: John Fielder, Mark Mulvany (design), Mountain Ranges of Colorado
- 2006: Tom Vezo (photo), Chuck Hagner, Wings of Spring: Courtship, Nesting and Fledging
- 2006: Jeffrey C. Miller, Daniel H. Janzen, Winifred Hallwachs, 100 Caterpillars
- 2007: Kevin Starr, Steve Roper, Glen Denny, Yosemite in the Sixties
- 2007: Stephen Brown, Arctic Wings: Birds of the Arctic National Wildlife Refuge
- 2008: Guy Motil, Surfboards
- 2008: Susan Hallsten McGarry, Bruce Aiken (paintings), Bruce Aiken's Grand Canyon: An Intimate Affair
- 2008: Ed Cooper, Soul of the Heights: 50 Years Going to the Mountains
- 2009: Lars Jonsson, Lars Jonsson's Birds
- 2010: David A. Patterson, Matt Patterson (illus.), Freshwater Fish of the Northeast
- 2011: Kate Davis, Rob Palmer, Nick Dunlop, Raptors of the West Captured in Photographs
- 2012: David J. Hall, Beneath Cold Seas: The Underwater Wilderness of the Pacific Northwest
- 2013: Brian B. King, The Appalachian Trail: Celebrating America's Hiking Trail
- 2013: David Liittschwager, A World in One Cubic Foot: Portraits of Biodiversity
- 2014: Bruce L. Smith, Life on the Rocks: A Portrait of the American Mountain Goat (tied)
- 2014: Andy Anderson (photography), Tom Rosenbauer (essays), Salt: Coastal and Flats Fishing (tied)
- 2015: Thomas D. Mangelsen (photo) and Todd Wilkinson (text), The Last Great Wild Places: Forty Years of Wildlife Photography by Thomas D. Mangelsen
- 2016: Gerrit Vyn (photo), Jane Jeszeck (design), The Living Bird: 100 Years of Listening to Nature
- 2016: Tom Adler and Evan Backes (design), Dean Fidelman (photo editing), Yosemite in the Fifties: The Iron Age
- 2016: Todd Reed, Brad Reed, Todd and Brad Reed's Michigan: Wednesdays in the Mitten
- 2017: David Yarrow, Wild Encounters: Iconic Photographs of the World's Vanishing Animals and Cultures
- 2018: Kathy Love, Noppadol Paothong (photo), Stephanie Thurber and Susan Ferber (design), Sage Grouse: Icon of the West
- 2019: Pete McBride (photos and text), Susi Oberhelman (design), The Grand Canyon: Between River and Rim.
- 2020: Rob Badger and Nita Winter: Beauty and the Beast: California Wildflowers and Climate Change
- 2021: Chase Reynolds Ewald (essay), Audrey Hall (photography), Bison: Portrait of an Icon
- 2022: QT Luong, Our National Monuments: America's Hidden Gems
- 2022: Jenny deFouw Geuder, Drawn to Birds: A Naturalist's Sketchbook
- 2023: Thomas D. Mangelsen, Seasons of Yellowstone: Yellowstone and Grand Teton National Parks
- 2024: Pete McBride, The Colorado River: Chasing Water
- 2025: W. John Kress, Smithsonian Trees of North America

=== Instructional ===
- 1997: Jonathan Hanson, Roseann Hanson, Ragged Mountain Press Guide to Outdoor Sports
- 1998: Duane Raleigh, Knots and Ropes for Climbers
- 1999: Mark F. Twight, James Martin, Extreme Alpinism: Climbing Light, Fast and High
- 2000: Mark Harvey, The National Outdoor Leadership School's Wilderness Guide
- 2001: Tom Rosenbauer, Rod Walinchus (illus.), Henry Ambrose (photo), The Orvis Fly-Tying Guide
- 2002: Shelley Johnson, The Complete Sea Kayaker's Handbook
- 2002: Paul Deegan, The Mountain Traveller's Handbook
- 2003: Jon Rounds, Wayne Dickert, Skip Brown (photo), Taina Litwak (illus.), Basic Canoeing: All the Skills and Tools You Need to Get Started
- 2004: Craig Luebben, Rock Climbing: Mastering the Basic Skills
- 2005: Andy Tyson, Mike Clelland (illus.), Michael Kennedy (ed.), Glacier Mountaineering: An Illustrated Guide to Glacier Travel and Crevasse Rescue
- 2005: Wayne Dickert, Jon Rounds, Skip Brown (photo), Roberto Sabas (illus.), Basic Kayaking: All the Skills and Gear You Need to Get Started
- 2006: Scott Graham, Extreme Kids: How to Connect with Your Children Through Today's Extreme (and not so extreme) Outdoor Sports
- 2007: Tim Brink, The Complete Mountain Biking Manual
- 2008: Guy Andrews, Road Bike Maintenance
- 2008: Ken Whiting, Kevin Varette, Whitewater Kayaking: The Ultimate Guide
- 2009: Katie Brown, Ben Moon (photo), Girl on the Rocks: A Woman's Guide to Climbing with Strength, Grace and Courage
- 2010: Andrew Bisharat, Sport Climbing: From Top Rope to Redpoint, Techniques for Climbing Success
- 2011: Robin Barton, The Cycling Bible: The Complete Guide for all Cyclists from Novice to Expert
- 2012: Jerry Monkman, AMC Guide to Outdoor Digital Photography: Creating Great Nature and Adventure Photos
- 2012: Kristin Hostetter, Backpacker Magazine's Complete Guide to Outdoor Gear Maintenance and Repair: Step by Step Techniques to Maximize Performance and Save Money
- 2013: Mike Zawaski, Snow Travel: Skills for Climbing, Hiking, and Moving Across Snow
- 2014: Steve House, Scott Johnston, Training for the New Alpinism: A Manual for the Climber as Athlete
- 2014: Yvon Chouinard, Craig Mathews and Mauro Mazzo, Simple Fly Fishing: Techniques for Tenkara and Rod & Reel
- 2015: Nate Ostis, NOLS River Rescue Guide
- 2016: Dave Hall with Jon Ulrich, Winter in the Wilderness: A Field Guide to Primitive Survival Skills
- 2017: Liz Thomas, Backpacker Long Trails: Mastering the Art of the Thru-hike
- 2017: Charles R. Farabee, Big Walls, Swift Waters: Epic Stories from Yosemite Search and Rescue
- 2018: Molly Absolon, The Ultimate Guide to Whitewater Rafting and River Camping
- 2019: Steve House, Scott Johnston and Kilian Jornet, Training for the Uphill Athlete: A Manual for Mountain Runners and Ski Mountaineers
- 2020: Maria Hines and Mercedes Pollmeier: Peak Nutrition: Smart Fuel for Outdoor Adventure
- 2020: Pete Whittaker: Crack Climbing: The Definitive Guide
- 2021-2025: [no award]

=== Nature guidebook ===
- 1997: Mark Stensaas, Jeff Sonstegard (illus.), Canoe Country Flora
- 1998: Alan Tennant, A Field Guide to Snakes of Florida
- 1998: Stephen R. Jones, Ruth Carol Cushman, Colorado Nature Almanac
- 1999: James Halfpenny, Todd Telander (illus.), Dana Kim-Wincapaw (design), Scats and Tracks of the Rocky Mountains: A Field Guide to the Signs of 70 Wildlife Species
- 2000: Kate Wynne & Malia Schwartz, Garth Mix (illus.), Guide to Marine Mammals & Turtles of the U.S. Atlantic and Gulf of Mexico
- 2001: Jeffrey Glassberg, Butterflies Through Binoculars: A Field Guide to the Butterflies of Western North America
- 2001: Scott Weidensaul, The Raptor Almanac: A Comprehensive Guide to Eagles, Hawks, Falcons, and Vultures
- 2002: Irwin M. Brodo, Sylvia Duran Sharnoff, Stephen Sharnoff, Lichens of North America
- 2002: Mark Elbroch, Eleanor Marks, Bird Tracks & Sign: A Guide to North American Species
- 2003: Mark Elbroch, Mammal Tracks and Sign: A Guide to North American Species
- 2003: Milton S. Love, Mary Yoklavich, Lyman Thorsteinson, The Rockfishes of the Northeast Pacific
- 2004: Kurt Mead, Dragonflies of the North Woods
- 2005: Whit Gibbons, Mike Dorcas, Snakes of the Southeast
- 2005: Laura Riley, William Riley, Nature's Strongholds: The World's Great Wildlife Reserves
- 2006: Charissa Reid, Yellowstone Expedition Guide: The Modern Way to Explore America's Oldest National Park
- 2006: David L. Wagner, Caterpillars of Eastern North America
- 2007: Robin L. Restall, Clemencia Rodner, Miguel Lentino, Birds of Northern South America: An Identification Guide
- 2008: Tomas S. Schulenberg, Douglas F. Stotz, Daniel F. Lane, John P. O'Neill, Theodore A. Parker III, Birds of Peru
- 2009: Roger Tory Peterson, Peterson Field Guide to Birds of North America
- 2009: Dennis Paulson, Dragonflies and Damselflies of the West
- 2010: Charley Eiseman, Noah Charney, Tracks and Sign of Insects and Other Invertebrates: A Guide to North American Species
- 2010: Jonathan Poppele, Night Sky: A Field Guide to the Constellations
- 2010: Steven N. G. Howell, Molt in North American Birds
- 2011: Mary Holland, Naturally Curious: A Photographic Field Guide Through the Fields, Woods and Marshes of New England
- 2012: Noble S. Proctor, Patrick J. Lynch, A Field Guide to the Southeast Coast & Gulf of Mexico
- 2013: Jeffrey E. Belth, Butterflies of Indiana: A Field Guide
- 2013: Richard Crossley, Jerry Liguori and Brian Sullivan, The Crossley ID Guide: Raptors
- 2013: Kurt F. Johnson, The Field Guide to Yellowstone and Grand Teton National Parks
- 2014: Tom Stephenson, Scott Whittle, The Warbler Guide
- 2015: Kate Wynne and Garth Mix (illus.), Guide to Marine Mammals and Turtles of the U.S. Pacific
- 2015: Arthur V. Evans, Beetles of Eastern North America
- 2016: Teresa Marrone and Walt Sturgeon, Mushrooms of the Northeast: A Simple Guide to Common Mushrooms
- 2016: Louis D. Druehl and Bridgette E. Clarkston, Pacific Seaweeds: A Guide to the Common Seaweeds of the West Coast
- 2017: Mike Krebill, The Scout's Guide to Wild Edibles
- 2017: James L. Monroe, David M. Wright, Butterflies of Pennsylvania: A Field Guide
- 2018: Robert Michael Pyle, Caitlin C. LaBar, Butterflies of the Pacific Northwest
- 2019: Jeffrey H. Skevington and Michelle M. Locke, Field Guide to the Flower Flies of Northeastern North America
- 2019: Laura Cotterman, Damon Waitt and Alan Weakley, Wildflowers of the Atlantic Southeast
- 2020: Douglas Kent: Foraging Southern California: 118 Nutritious, Tasty and Abundant Foods
- 2021: Patrick J. Lynch, A Field Guide to the Mid-Atlantic Coast
- 2022: Olivia Messinger Carril and Joseph S. Wilson, Common Bees of Eastern North America
- 2023: Samuel Thayer, Sam Thayer's Field Guide to Edible Plants of Eastern & Central North America
- 2023: John Kallas, Edible Wild Plants: Wild Foods from Foraging to Feasting (Vol 2)
- 2024: Patrick J. Lynch, A Field Guide to the Connecticut River: From New Hampshire to Long Island Sound
- 2025: Matt Ritter, Michael Kauffmann, California Trees: A guide to the native species

=== Outdoor adventure guidebook ===
- 1997: [no award]
- 1998: Tom Lorang Jones, John Fielder (photo), Colorado's Continental Divide Trail
- 1999: John Ross, Jeff Wincapaw (art dir.), Trout Unlimited's Guide to America's 100 Best Trout Streams
- 1999: Marty Basch, Vermont and New Hampshire Winter Trails
- 2000: Roger Schumann, Jan Shriner, Guide to Sea Kayaking Central and Northern California
- 2000: Lynna Howard, Montana and Idaho's Continental Divide Trail
- 2001: Mark Kroese, Fifty Favorite Climbs: The Ultimate North American Tick List
- 2001: Bill Burnham, Mary Burnham, Hike America Virginia: An Atlas of Virginia's Greatest Hiking Adventures
- 2001: Matt Heid, 101 Hikes in Northern California: Exploring Mountains, Valleys, and Seashore
- 2002: John Mock, Kimberley O'Neil, Hiking the Sierra Nevada
- 2002: Michael Wood, Colby Coombs, Alaska: A Climbing Guide
- 2003: Marc J. Soares, 100 Hikes in Yosemite National Park
- 2003: Mike Woodmansee, Trekking Washington
- 2003: Rich Landers, 100 Hikes in the Inland Northwest: Eastern Washington, Northern Rockies, Wallowas
- 2004: Douglas Lorain, 100 Classic Hikes in Oregon
- 2005: Andrew Dean Nystrom, Top Trails Yellowstone and Grand Teton National Parks
- 2005: Roxanna Brook, Jared McMillen, Red Rock Canyon: A Climbing Guide
- 2005: Eric J. Newell, Allison J. Newell, Idaho's Salmon River: A River Runner's Guide to the River of No Return
- 2006: Matt Leidecker, The Middle Fork of the Salmon River: A Comprehensive Guide
- 2007: Tom Martin, Duwain Whitis, Guide to the Colorado River in the Grand Canyon
- 2008: Bill Burnham, Mary Burnham, Florida Keys Paddling Atlas
- 2009: Duwain Whitis, Barbara Vinson, Guide to the Green and Yampa Rivers in Dinosaur National Monument
- 2009: Dave Eckardt, The Guide to Baja Sea Kayaking
- 2010: Greg Witt, Exploring Havasupai: A Guide to the Heart of the Grand Canyon
- 2011: Paul W. Bauer, The Rio Grande: A River Guide to the Geology and Landscapes of Northern New Mexico
- 2012: Todd Martin, Grand Canyoneering: Exploring the Rugged Gorges and Secret Slots of the Grand Canyon
- 2013: Michael Joseph Oswald, Your Guide to the National Parks: The Complete Guide to All 58 National Parks
- 2014: Joe Cook, Chattahoochee River User's Guide
- 2015: Tim Palmer, Field Guide to Oregon Rivers
- 2015: Rick Weber, Muir Valley Pocket Guide
- 2016: Dolores Kong and Dan Ring, Hiking Acadia National Park: A Guide to the Park's Greatest Hiking Adventures
- 2017: Jerry and Marcy Monkman, Outdoor Adventures, Acadia National Park: Your Guide to the Best Hiking, Biking and Paddling
- 2018: Damon Corso, Discovering the John Muir Trail: An Inspirational Guide to America's Most Beautiful Hike
- 2019: Matt Johanson, Sierra Summits: A Guidet to Fifty Peak Experiences in California's Range of Light
- 2019: Ann Marie Brown, 150 Nature Hot Spots in California: The Best Parks, conservation Areas and Wild Places
- 2020: Aaron R. Reed, The Local Angler Fly Fishing Austin & Central Texas
- 2020: Tracy Salcedo: Hiking Lassen Volcanic National Park: A Guide to the Park's Greatest Hiking Adventures
- 2021: Luc Mehl, Illustrations by Sarah K. Glaser, The Packraft Handbook: An Instructional Guide for the Curious
- 2022: James Kaiser, Rocky Mountain National Park: The Complete Guide
- 2022: Diana Helmuth, illustrations by Latasha Dunston, How to Suffer Outside: A Beginner’s Guide to Hiking and Backpacking
- 2023: Jeremy Jones, The Art of Shralpinism: Lessons from the Mountains
- 2023: Robert H. McConnell, Fly Fishing Houston & Southeastern Texas
- 2024: Joe Stock, The Avalanche Factor: Understanding and Avoiding Avalanches
- 2024: Renny Jackson, Leigh N. Ortenburger, A Climber’s Guide to the Teton Range
- 2025: Nicole Coenen, Axe in Hand: A Woodchopper's Guide to Blades, Wood and Fire
- 2025: Michael Haynes, Hiking Trails of Mainland Nova Scotia

=== Works of significance ===
- 1997–1998: [no award]
- 1999: Karl Rohnke, Cowstails and Cobras II: A Guide to Games, Initiatives, Ropes Courses, & Adventure Curriculum
- 1999: John Hart, Walking Softy in the Wilderness: The Sierra Club Guide to Backpacking
- 1999: William Nealy, Kayaking: An Animated Guide of Intermediate and Advanced Whitewater Technique
- 1999: John Long, How to Rock Climb
- 1999: Derek Hutchinson, Expedition Kayaking
- 2000–2002: [no award]
- 2003: Gene Daniell, Steven D. Smith, AMC White Mountain Guide: Hiking Trails of the White Mountain National Forest
- 2004–2006: [no award]
- 2007: Ann T. Colson (ed.), Connecticut Walk Book: The Guide to the Blue-Blazed Hiking Trails of Western Connecticut
- 2008–2013: [no award]
- 2014: Robert Birkby, Fieldbook: Scouting’s Manual of Basic and Advanced Skills for Outdoor Adventure (4th edition)
- 2015-2024: [no award]
- 2025: Thatcher Hogan, Mapping the Adirondacks: Colvin, Blake and the First True Survey of the Great Adirondack Wilderness
