= Marlo =

Marlo is a name which may refer to:

== People ==
=== Given name, stage name or nickname ===
Notable people with the given name, stage name or nickname include:

- Marlo Dahl (born 1972), Canadian curler
- Marlo Hampton (born 1976), American reality television personality
- Marlo Hoogstraten (born 1980), Dutch DJ
- Martin "Marlo" Hyland (1969–2006), Irish gangster
- Marlo Carter Kirkpatrick (born 1965), American author and photographer
- Marlo Koponen, Finnish ice hockey player
- Marlo Lewis (1915–1993), American television executive producer, co-producer of The Ed Sullivan Show
- Marlo Mendoza Peralta (born 1950), Roman Catholic Archbishop of Nueva Segovia in the Philippines
- Marlo Morgan (born 1937), American author
- Marlo Mortel (Jhann Marlowe Pamintuan; born 1993), Filipino actor
- Marlo Poras (born 1971), American filmmaker
- Marlo Thomas (born 1937), American actress

=== Surname ===
Notable people with the surname include:

- Ed Marlo (1913–1991), stage name of American magician Edward Malkowski
- Karl Marlo, pseudonym of Karl Georg Winkelblech (1810–1865), German professor, scientist, chemist and state socialist
- Micki Marlo (1928–2016), American model and singer

== Fictional characters ==
- Marlo Chandler, in the Marvel Comics universe
- Marlo Higgins, in the American children's television series Marlo and the Magic Movie Machine
- Marlo Stanfield, a drug kingpin on the television series The Wire
- Hurrambi Marlo, a character in the DC Comics universe

== See also ==
- Marlos (born 1988), Brazilian footballer
