= Gregory Stone =

Gregory Stone may refer to:

- Gregory S. Stone (born 1957), American biologist
- Gregory L. Stone, American Air Force captain murdered by fellow soldier; see United States v. Hasan K. Akbar
- Greg Stone (born 1961), Australian actor, birth name Gregory
- Gregory Stone (composer) (1900-1991); see Academy Award for Best Original Score
