= Take a Seat =

Take A Seat is a tandem bicycle touring project created by Dominic Gill. The film was shown on television in the United Kingdom and was also released as a book.

== History ==
In 2005, Gill decided to cycle from Alaska to Argentina, a 20,000 mile journey that took a little over 2 years. He took a tandem bicycle one, picking up secondary riders spontaneously as a means of getting to know the people and the places he visited.

The film won Special Jury Prize at the Banff Mountain Film Festival in 2009 and has since been shown in over 400 cities worldwide. The book won the History/Biography Prize at the National Outdoor Book Awards in 2011.

Gill later created additional projects under the Take A Seat umbrella, including "Take A Seat: Alberta", "Take A Seat: Egypt" and "Take A Seat: Across America".
