= Walden Woods Project =

US non-profit organization

The Walden Woods Project (WWP) is a nonprofit organization located in Lincoln, Massachusetts, devoted to the legacy of Henry David Thoreau and the preservation of Walden Woods, the forest around Walden Pond that spans Lincoln and Concord, Massachusetts. It was founded in 1990 by musician Don Henley to prevent two development projects in Walden Woods. Its mission has since expanded from conservation to research and education on the works of Henry David Thoreau. In 1998, the Thoreau Institute at Walden Woods was founded as part of the Project; today its library houses a collection of Thoreau-related resources.

== History ==
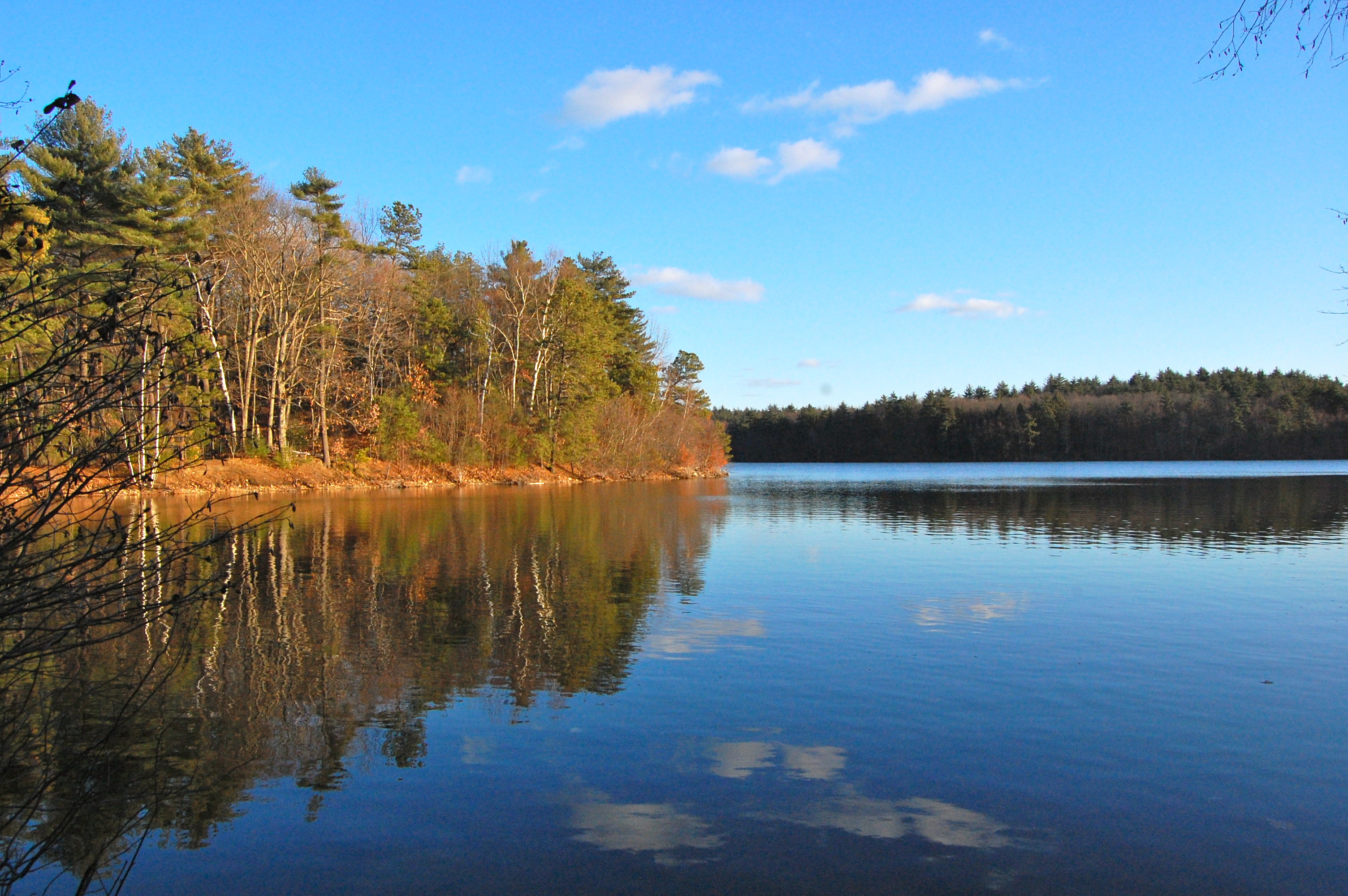
Walden Pond in Concord, Massachusetts

The Walden Woods and Walden Pond are known for their association with the writer Henry David Thoreau who lived by the shore of Walden Pond and was inspired by the environment there in his writings. In 1989, two commercial development projects were proposed within Walden Woods at Bear Garden Hill and Brister's Hill. Although 60% of Walden Woods was already protected, the threat of encroaching development in Walden Woods prompted grassroots organizers to oppose the plan, and National Trust for Historic Preservation also listed Walden Woods as one of America's Eleven Most Endangered Historic Places. Don Henley, who was influenced by Thoreau's writings in college, offered to lend his support to the opposition movement.

In 1990, Henley founded the Walden Woods Project, which ultimately purchased both of the proposed development sites, as well as other sites. The first of these, a 25-acre site on Bear Garden Hill, was bought in January 1991 costing $3.55 million. Another 25 acres at Boiling Spring was purchased for $1.25 million in April 1992, an 18.6-acre site on Brister's hill for $3.5 million in May 1993, 18 acres at Pine Hill in July 1994 for $1.2 million, and 10 acres at Fair Haven Hill for $900,000 in December 1995. The land acquired for preservation totaled 96 acres in the 1990s. Later, 41 acres of land along the Sudbury River was acquired as a gift, and further land as well as the Adams House were bought. An interpretive trail was later designed on Brister's hill, featuring quotes from Thoreau and individuals he influenced, and a section explaining ecological succession.

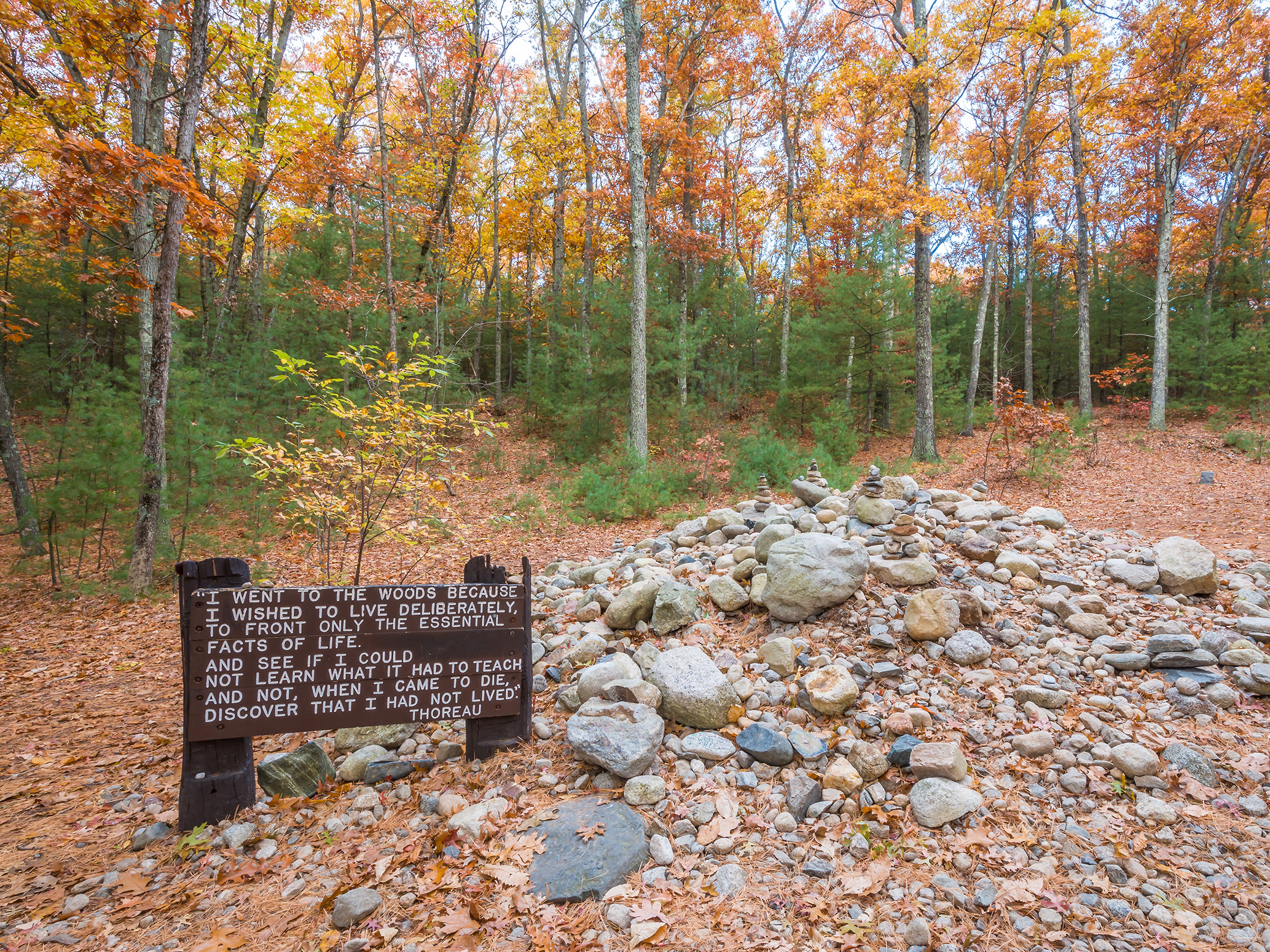
A quote from Henry David Thoreau at Walden Woods

To help cover the cost of the project, Henley organized a series of benefit concerts, which included artists such as Elton John, Aerosmith, Melissa Etheridge, Sting, Jimmy Buffett, John Fogerty, Neil Young, Roger Waters and others. In 1992, Henley initiated the recording of a charity album, Common Thread: The Songs of the Eagles, released in 1993 to raise funds for the project. It was certified 3× Platinum in the United States by the RIAA on June 27, 1994. He also donated part of the proceeds from the Eagles' Hell Freezes Over album and tour. Through these and various other fund-raising efforts, which included T-shirt sales and a book Heaven Is Under Our Feet, $15 million were raised by 1996, and $22 million were eventually raised in total.

The organization pledged to find a new location for the thwarted housing development planned. They later paid for the appraisal and environmental assessment on a 12-acre site in West Concord, which in 2013 was transferred to the Concord Housing Development Corporation. The project's headquarters were moved from Boston to Lincoln, Massachusetts, in 1997, and in 1998 the Thoreau Institute officially opened. Today the WWP manages nearly 170 acres across the 2,680 acres of Walden Woods.

== Education ==
The Walden Woods Project runs a number of educational programs for students, educators, and the general public. The WWP hosts both on-site educational workshops and Skype sessions with Thoreau Institute library curator Jeffrey S. Cramer. In addition, it organizes an essay contest for students entitled "Live Deliberately." Since 2003 the WWP has offered an annual professional development course for high school educators entitled "Approaching Walden".

== Film ==
Walden (2017), a short (22 minutes) film about Henley's WWP; it was executive produced by Ken Burns.

== External sources ==
- Walden Woods Project Official Site
