= Nicole Coenen =

Canadian lumberjack and influencer

- Born: London, Ontario
- Education: Fanshawe College
- Occupations: Lumberjack, videographer, influencer, author

Nicole Maple Coenen is a Canadian lumberjack, videographer, influencer, and author. She is best known for her social media content, often featuring her chopping wood, and is known as the "lesbian lumberjack"; her content features thirst traps, and she has been described by PinkNews and GO Magazine, among others, as a lesbian heartthrob. She learned how to chop wood after relocating from her former home in London, Ontario during the early COVID-19 pandemic. She is the author of Axe in Hand: A Woodchopper's Guide to Blades, Wood and Fire, which she published in 2025: it went on to receive the National Outdoor Book Award for Best Outdoor Adventure Guide that same year.

== Early life ==
Coenen grew up in London, Ontario, and has stated that her community was very conservative. She was unable to come out as lesbian and had difficulty introducing aspects of herself such as strength: she has stated she found herself trying to look weaker than she was. Around 2008, she tried to become a YouTuber and created vlogs, but these were ultimately not successful. She attended film school at Fanshawe College.

After graduation, she created two series of videos for kids, featuring puppets: the first focused on mental health issues, and the second focused on LGBTQ issues and gender identity. By the time of the second series, in 2017, she had come out as lesbian. She subsequently went on to run her own production company. She also worked as a personal trainer.

== Career ==
In the early stages of the COVID-19 pandemic, she left London and moved to Rossland, British Columbia. There, she worked on a farm and started learning how to chop wood: she has recounted starting with great difficulty and not being able to split the wood. She learned how from a group of woodcutters in her local area. She also worked as a communications specialist for a water restoration nonprofit.

Around her time in Rossland, she began creating social media content focused on woodcutting. It started as a parody of Thoren Bradley, a popular social media influencer, but after she received positive attention for it, including from Bradley himself, she decided to take content creation more seriously. Her first video with a million views was a wood-chopping video she described as a "lesbian thirst-trap". Her colleagues soon started to recognize her, and she eventually moved from the nonprofit to full time content creation.

She later moved to Pender Island, British Columbia, where she became involved in a nonprofit that chops firewood for neighbors. She resides in the backyard cottage of a fellow lesbian couple, who she has described as "like.. cool lesbian aunts". She is also training to become a blacksmith: she met her mentor when he offered to make an axe for her, and soon realized that they lived on neighboring islands.

Her content has continued to largely focus on wood, with videos largely featuring wood chopping using an axe or a sword. However, she occasionally creates videos providing fitness advice and lifestyle videos. Her content is especially popular among the lesbian community on social media, where she is viewed as a heartthrob. GO Magazine commented that she "takes thirst trap to a whole new level" and Gay Times dubbed her "TikTok's 'maple mommy'". she is also known online as the "lesbian lumberjack". She frequently receives internet comments that have been described as mansplaining, but described it as "funny".

She has stated she plans to integrate content focused on environmental education. She has also stated one of her main inspirations is the thought of encouraging little girls to "go climb a tree or chop a piece of wood or pick up a tool that they didn’t feel like they could before".

She released her first book, Axe in Hand: A Woodchopper's Guide to Blades, Wood and Fire, in 2025: it includes advice on skills including restoring axes, selecting wood, and building a fire, as well as a history of axes. Library Journal noted LGBTQIA+ axe facts included in the book and activities included when dubbing it "a great introduction to axes and woodcutting", while the National Outdoor Book Awards noted the color photos in the book when awarding it the 2025 National Outdoor Book Award for Best Outdoor Adventure Guide.
