= The Ocean's Menagerie =

2025 non-fiction book by Drew Harvell

- Author: Drew Harvell
- Genre: Non fiction
- Publisher: Viking Press
- Publication date: April 22, 2025
- ISBN: 978-0-593-65428-6

The Ocean's Menagerie: How Earth's Strangest Creatures Reshape the Rules of Life is a 2025 non-fiction book by marine biologist Drew Harvell, It was published by Viking Press. The book explores the evolution of invertebrate marine life and the environmental threats facing the marine ecosystem.

== Reception ==
The book received positive reviews from critics. Kirkus Reviews referred to the book as "a good read about bizarre creatures", while The Times referred to it as "a deep dive into the strange kingdom of the ocean". George I. Matsumoto, in a review for Oceanography, described the book as "a true marvel".

Publishers Weekly noted ow "Harvell emphasizes invertebrates’ outsize influence on their ecosystems, describing how giant clams filter pathogenic bacteria from water and how coral provide protection from waves and erosion for the crustaceans, fish, and other creatures that live on reefs." Claudia De Luca of Earth.org wrote that "Harvell leads readers in her underwater adventures, from a submarine lab in the Caribbean to Fiji’s Great Sea Reef, guiding them through overlooked marvels and biological adaptations that, through her storytelling, become actual superpowers."
