= Ted Steinberg =

American historian

Ted Steinberg (born 1961) is an American author and historian. He is the Adeline Barry Davee Distinguished Professor of History at Case Western Reserve University in Cleveland, Ohio.

== Background ==
Born in Brooklyn, he received his B.A. from Tufts University in 1983. He received a Ph.D. in history from Brandeis University in 1989.

== Career ==
From 1990 to 1993 he was a visiting assistant professor at the University of Michigan. From 1993 to 1996 he was an assistant professor at the New Jersey Institute of Technology. He was hired at Case Western Reserve University in 1996.

Steinberg is the author of several books in U.S. history and environment history that focus on the relationship between ecological forces and social power. His best known works include Down to Earth: Nature’s Role in American History (2002); Acts of God: The Unnatural History of Natural Disaster in America (2000); and American Green: The Obsessive Quest for the Perfect Lawn (2006). His most recent book, Gotham Unbound: The Ecological History of Greater New York (2014), reinterpreted the New York metropolitan area’s history from an environmental perspective.

== Awards and honors ==
Steinberg has been the recipient of fellowships and grants from the Michigan Society of Fellows (1990–1993), the John Simon Guggenheim Memorial Foundation (1996), the American Council of Learned Societies (where he was a Frederick Burkhardt Fellow in 2000), Yale University (where he was the B. Benjamin Zucker Fellow in 2006), and the National Endowment for the Humanities (2010).

His books have received several literary prizes:

- Co-winner of the Law and Society Association's J. Willard Hurst Prize for the best work in socio-legal history in 1992 for Nature Incorporated: Industrialization and the Waters of New England.
- Winner of the Old Sturbridge Village E. Harold Hugo Memorial Book Prize for the best book on the history and material culture of rural New England in 1992 for Nature Incorporated: Industrialization and the Waters of New England.
- Winner of the Ohio Academy of History's Publication Award in 2001 for Acts of God: The Unnatural History of Natural Disaster in America.
- Winner of a National Outdoor Book Award in the category of Nature & the Environment for Down to Earth: Nature’s Role in American History, 2002.
- Winner of the New York Society Library New York City Book Award for Natural History in 2015 for Gotham Unbound: The Ecological History of Greater New York.
- Winner of the Association of American Publishers PROSE Award (U.S. History category) in 2015 for Gotham Unbound: The Ecological History of Greater New York.

== Publications ==
- Nature Incorporated: Industrialization and the Waters of New England, Cambridge University Press, 1991. ISBN 9780521527118
- Slide Mountain, or the Folly of Owning Nature, University of California Press, 1995. ISBN 9780520207097
- “Do-It-Yourself Deathscape: The Unnatural History of Natural Disaster in South Florida,” Environmental History 2 (October 1997): 414–438.
- Acts of God: The Unnatural History of Natural Disaster, Oxford University Press, 2000. ISBN 9780195309683
- “Down to Earth: Nature, Agency, and Power in History,” American Historical Review 107 (2002): 798–820.
- Down to Earth: Nature’s Role in American History, Oxford University Press, 2002. ISBN 9780199797394. 4th edition, 2018. ISBN 9780190864422
- “Fertilizing the Tree of Knowledge: Environmental History Comes of Age,” Journal of Interdisciplinary History 35 (Autumn 2004): 265–277.
- American Green: The Obsessive Quest for the Perfect Lawn, W. W. Norton, 2006. ISBN 9780393329308
- "Can Capitalism Save the Planet?: On the Origins of Green Liberalism," Radical History Review 2010 (May 2010): 7–24.
- Gotham Unbound: The Ecological History of Greater New York, Simon & Schuster, 2014. ISBN 9781476741246
- “With the Middle East peace process 'dead,' now what? Douglas Kerr and Ted Steinberg (Opinion),” Cleveland.com, March 23, 2016.
- "Let Them Eat Cake: a Journey into Edward Said’s Humanism," CounterPunch, September 6, 2019.
- “Private Property and the Defiance of Natural Limits: Coastal Flooding in the United States’ Largest City,” Global Environment 11 (2018): 208–218.
- “Can Karl Polanyi Explain the Anthropocene? The Commodification of Nature and the Great Acceleration,” Geographical Review 109 (April 2019): 265–270.
