= Buddy Levy =

American writer

Buddy Levy (born February 2, 1960) is a professor of writing at Washington State University, a freelance magazine writer, TV personality, and author of nine non-fiction books.

== Biography ==
Levy was born February 2, 1960, in New Orleans, and grew up in Sun Valley, Idaho. He had connections to famous writers from an early age: his babysitter was Ernest Hemingway's granddaughter, Margaux Hemingway; and Ernest's eldest son, Jack Hemingway, wrote the foreword in Levy's first book, Echoes on Rimrock: In Pursuit of the Chukar Partridge. He published his first story when he was 14 years old in The Wood River Journal. He graduated from the University of Idaho, B.A., 1986, M.A., 1988. He worked at the University of Idaho from 1988 to 1993, and at Washington State University since 1991. He teaches creative non-fiction, fiction, screen writing, and technical and professional writing at WSU in Pullman, Washington.

== Career ==
Levy is a freelance magazine writer in the realm of travel and adventure journalism. He has written for Discover, Field & Stream, Canoe & Kayak, Hemispheres, and others.

Levy's freelance writing career began in 1998 covering the adventure racing event Eco-Challenge, in Morocco. He spent the next seven years covering the adventure racing circuit. He met Erik Weihenmayer, a blind adventurer who had summited Mount Everest, and spent four or five years writing the book No Barriers: A Blind Man's Journey to Kayak the Grand Canyon (2017). This was made into the documentary The Weight of Water for which Levy was a contributing writer.

Levy was one of the four hosts on Brad Meltzer's Decoded, a 25-episode 'history mystery debunked' show that aired from 2010 to 2012 on the History Channel. He was a talking head on The Men Who Built America ("Frontiersmen" episode), produced by Leonardo DiCaprio for the History Channel. In 2018, his book Conquistador was optioned to be a television series.

American Legend: The Real-Life Adventures of David Crockett (2005) is a biography of David Crockett, and Levy's first work of history. He contends Crocket's autobiography prefigures the literary genre of realism. A Publishers Weekly review says that Levy exposed some of Crockett's deficiencies without making judgements.

Conquistador: Hernan Cortes, King Montezuma, and the Last Stand of the Aztecs (2008) is a history of Hernan Cortes and the conquest of the Aztec Empire, a monumental event in world history that dramatically set the stage for the future of the Americas. He shows that, contrary to popular belief of a small number of smarter and better armed Europeans, the Spanish were nearly defeated, prevailing only after gaining the support of neighboring tribes. Historian Arthur L. Herman in the Wall Street Journal says Levy successfully avoids falling into the trap of ideology over retelling about European conquests, focusing on the individuals involved. Reviewers considered it a good starting point for the general reader.

River of Darkness: Francisco Orellana and the Deadly First Voyage Through the Amazon (2011) recounts 16th century Conquistador Francisco Orellana's epic voyage down the length of the Amazon river, the first non-native to do so and live to tell about it. Reviewers said it was a great adventure story well told.

Washington State University football coach Mike Leach collaborated with Levy to write Geronimo: Leadership Strategies of an American Warrior (2014). It aligned with Leach's interest in Geronimo, and both men worked at the same school. Levy shared Leach's fascination with Geronimo, and the two men became friends. They combined Leach's theories on leadership with Levy's knowledge of history and writing to create a two-pronged book about Geronimo's life and leadership.

Between 2020 and 2025, Levy published the "Ice" trilogy, set during the golden age of polar exploration (1865 to 1928). The books are Labyrinth of Ice: The Triumphant and Tragic Greely Polar Expedition about the Greely Expedition (1881–1884). Next is Empire of Ice & Stone: The Disastrous and Heroic Voyage of the Karluk, about the last voyage of the Karluk (1913–1916) in the Pacific Arctic region. Finally he published Realm of Ice and Sky: Triumph, Tragedy, and History's Greatest Arctic Rescue, a tri-biography of attempts to reach the North Pole by airship between 1906 and 1928. He restores the reputations of Walter Wellman as a genuine innovator and explorer; and that of Italian commander Umberto Nobile, who had been unfairly maligned by Norwegian explorer Roald Amundsen and Benito Mussolini.

== Awards and honors ==
- 2024 Audie Award for History or Biography, finalist, Empire of Ice & Stone
- 2023 National Outdoor Book Award, History/Biography, winner, Empire of Ice & Stone
- 2023 Banff Mountain Book Award, Adventure Travel, shortlist, Empire of Ice & Stone
- 2020 National Outdoor Book Award, History/Biography, winner, Labyrinth of Ice
- 2020 Banff Mountain Book Award, Adventure Travel, winner, Labyrinth of Ice

== Works ==
- Realm of Ice and Sky: Triumph, Tragedy, and History's Greatest Arctic Rescue (2025)
- Empire of Ice & Stone: The Disastrous and Heroic Voyage of the Karluk (2022)
- Labyrinth of Ice: The Triumphant and Tragic Greely Polar Expedition (2020)
- No Barriers: A Blind Man's Journey to Kayak the Grand Canyon (2017)
- Geronimo: Leadership Strategies of an American Warrior (2014) - with Mike Leach
- River of Darkness: Francisco Orellana and the Deadly First Voyage Through the Amazon (2011)
- Conquistador: Hernan Cortes, King Montezuma, and the Last Stand of the Aztecs (2008)
- American Legend: The Real-Life Adventures of David Crockett (2005)
- Echoes On Rimrock: In Pursuit of the Chukar Partridge (1998) - foreword by Jack Hemingway
