= Scott Weidensaul =

American naturalist and author

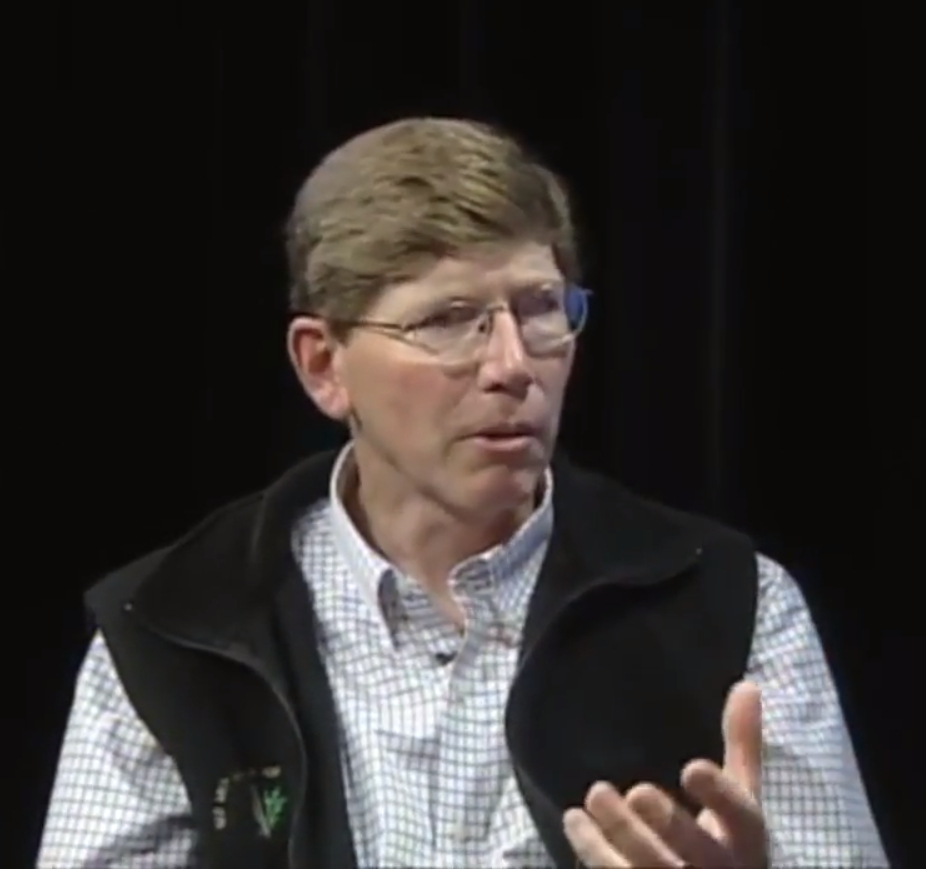
Scott Weidensaul in 2012

Scott Weidensaul (born 1959) is a Pennsylvania-based naturalist and author. He was a finalist for the 2000 Pulitzer Prize in general nonfiction for his book Living on the Wind: Across the Hemisphere With Migratory Birds.

== Profile and works ==
In 2000, Weidensaul was a finalist for the Pulitzer Prize in the general nonfiction category for his book Living on the Wind: Across the Hemisphere With Migratory Birds. In another of his works, Mountains of the Heart: A Natural History of the Appalachians, Weidensaul covers the geological changes that have happened to the Appalachians. He traces the mountains' geological origins from the Ice Ages through the diversity and richness of pre-Columbian and Colonial days on up to the modern era. For his Pulitzer-finalist book Living on the Wind: Across the Hemisphere With Migratory Birds, the author took to longtime systematic observation, which included the ornithological technique of banding, and observing the birds, besides the author talked to various experts—as well as amateur birders and ornithologists who have made many of the important discoveries about bird biology. Weidensaul has been a nature columnist for newspapers, including the Philadelphia Inquirer and he has written more than two dozen books on natural history, including Living on the Wind: Across the Hemisphere with Migratory Birds. Weidensaul's writing has appeared in publications including Smithsonian, the New York Times, Nature Conservancy, Pennsylvania Game News, National Wildlife and Audubon.

In addition to writing about wildlife, Weidensaul is an active field researcher whose work focuses on bird migration. Weidensaul coordinates the banding and research program at the Ned Smith Center for Nature and Art in Millersburg, Pennsylvania, overseeing three saw-whet owl sites in eastern and central Pennsylvania, which have been operating since 1997 called Project Owlnet. He is also a team member of Project SNOWstorm, a project that began in 2013 to study the ecology of wintering snowy owls. As a federally licensed hummingbird bander, Weidnesaul also bands vagrant western hummingbirds that migrate east.

== Works ==
- Return to Wild America: A Yearlong Search for the Continent's Natural Soul
- The Ghost with Trembling Wings: Science, Wishful Thinking and the Search for Lost Species
- Of a Feather: A Brief History of American Birding
- Mountains of the Heart: A Natural History of the Appalachians
- The Raptor Almanac: A Comprehensive Guide to Eagles, Hawks, Falcons, and Vultures (National Outdoor Book Award, Honorable Mention, Nature Guidebook, 2001)
- Living on the Wind: Across the Hemisphere With Migratory Birds
- The First Frontier: The Forgotten History of Struggle, Savagery and Endurance in Early America
- Peterson Reference Guide to Owls of North America and the Caribbean
- A World on the Wing: The Global Odyssey of Migratory Birds
- A Warbler's Journey. Children's book, illustrated by Nancy Lane
- The Return of the Oystercatcher: Saving Birds to Save the Planet

== See also ==
- Passenger pigeon
- Northern saw-whet owl
- Snowy owl
- Hawk Mountain Sanctuary
