= California Botanical Society =

Scientific journal

The California Botanical Society was founded by Willis Linn Jepson in 1913, since when it has advanced the knowledge of botanical sciences in the Western United States

== Services ==
The society services are: the journal Madroño, published since 1916; annual banquets in various California locations along with educational lectures; research support on green plants of Baja California, (enabled by the Annetta Carter Memorial Fund); graduate student support (together with the annual banquet); and community discussions with professional botanists.

== Journal ==
Madroño
- Discipline: Botany
- Language: English, Spanish
- Edited by: Matt Ritter

Publication details
- History: 1916–present
- Publisher: California Botanical Society (United States)
- Frequency: Quarterly

Standard abbreviations
- ISO 4: Madroño

Indexing
- ISSN: 0024-9637
- OCLC no.: 213802384

Links
- Journal homepage

Madroño is the quarterly peer-reviewed scientific journal of the Society. It was established in 1916 and focuses on botany in the western part of North America. Articles are published in English or Spanish. The current editor is Matt Ritter (California Polytechnic State University).

== See also ==
- University and Jepson Herbaria
- Cneoridium dumosum (Nuttall) Hooker F. Collected March 26, 1960, at an Elevation of about 1450 Meters on Cerro Quemazón, 15 Miles South of Bahía de Los Angeles, Baja California, México, Apparently for a Southeastward Range Extension of Some 140 Miles
