= Drew Harvell =

American-born marine ecologist

- Education: University of Washington, University of Alberta
- Scientific career
- Thesis: Partial predation, inducible defenses, and the population biology of a marine bryozoan (Membranipora membranacea) (1985)

Catherine Drew Harvell is an American-born marine ecologist who researches ocean biodiversity and ocean health, specializing in diseases in marine ecosystems.

== Early life and education ==
Harvell was born in Boston, Massachusetts, United States. Harvell completed her bachelor's degree in zoology with honors from the University of Alberta in 1978. She remained at University of Alberta to complete a master's degree in zoology, supervised by Fu-Shiang Chia. She completed her thesis and graduated in 1981. She attended the University of Washington to complete a Ph.D. in zoology and graduated in 1985.

== Research career ==
In 1986, Harvell joined the faculty in the Department of Ecology & Evolutionary Biology at Cornell University. Her research group focuses on a range of topics, including marine invertebrate biology and diversity to climate change and its impacts on disease ecology.

In 1998 Harvell co-edited a book with Ralph Tollrian on The Ecology and Evolution of Inducible Defenses. In 2016, Harvell published her first book for the popular media, A Sea of Glass: Searching for the Blaschkas' Fragile Legacy in an Ocean at Risk. The book explores Harvell's work as curator of the Cornell University Collection of Blaschka Invertebrate Models, which includes 570 detailed and highly accurate sculptures of marine creatures. Her second book in the popular press was published in 2019, titled Ocean Outbreak: Confronting the Rising Tide of Marine Disease. This book explores how corals, abalone, salmon, and starfish are being impacted by outbreaks of infectious diseases and suggestions actions that can be taken.

She wrote The Ocean's Menagerie in 2025.

== Awards and honors ==
Harvell's recognitions for her writing and professional accomplishments include:

2015 - Elected to the Ecological Society of America (ESA) Fellows Program

2016 - National Outdoor Book Award Winner, in the category of Natural History Literature for A Sea of Glass: Searching for the Blaschkas’ Fragile Legacy in an Ocean at Risk.

2016 - The Best “Art Meets Science” Books of 2016, one of eight books named by Smithsonian Magazine, for A Sea of Glass: Searching for the Blaschkas’ Fragile Legacy in an Ocean at Risk.

2017 - Honorable Mention, Rachel Carson Environment Book Award, Society of Environmental Journalists, for A Sea of Glass: Searching for the Blaschkas’ Fragile Legacy in an Ocean at Risk.

2020 - Ecological Society of America (ESA) Sustainability Science Award, which recognizes the authors of the scholarly work that makes the greatest contribution to the emerging science of ecosystem and regional sustainability through the integration of ecological and social sciences.

2020 - PROSE Award for Biological Sciences, for Ocean Outbreak: Confronting the Rising Tide of Marine Disease.

2020 - Selected to give the Rachel Carson Lecture for the American Geophysical Union (AGU) Fall Meeting 2020 on "Oceanic Pandemics from Foundation to Keystone Species."

== Personal life ==
Harvell is married with a daughter and a son who is a writer.
