= Chris Duff =

American expedition sea kayaker

Chris Duff is an American expedition sea kayaker, who is most notable for his large-scale projects and world-record breaking attempts. Since 1983, he has kayaked over 14,000 miles.

== Expeditions ==
Chris Duff is famous for many of his endurance kayaking expeditions, including circumnavigation of Iceland and solo circumnavigations of New Zealand's South Island and Ireland. He has also broken the world record for being the first person to circumnavigate Great Britain alone. When asked why he chooses to partake in these solo expeditions, he replied:

There are very few times in our busy lives where we have the luxury of true solitude. I love the simple focus of these journeys; the physical challenges of the sea balanced by the inner calm which comes from living purposefully and so simply.

In May 2012, Chris successfully crossed the Atlantic between the Outer Hebrides and the Faroe Islands, as part of a journey to Iceland in his kayak.

=== Millennial Expedition ===
In 1999, Chris Duff decided to circumnavigate the south island of New Zealand. He began preparations on 29 November 1999 but did not start his voyage until 5 December 1999. Despite being considerably shorter than many of his other routes, at around 1700 miles, this journey is viewed as particularly demanding due to its location in the Roaring Forties.

== Career ==
Duff has been a guest speaker on the subject of sea kayaking many times. His appearances include L.L.Bean Symposium (Maine 1987, 1999, 2000, 2001), West Coast Symposium (Washington 1997, 1998, 1999, 2000), and The Great Lakes Symposium (Michigan 1997 and 2001). He is also involved in many motivational talks to schools and businesses. In 1999 he was featured as the keynote speaker at Canoecopia. He also has a BCU four-star qualification for the teaching of sea kayaking.

=== Author ===
In addition to kayaking, Chris Duff has written two books about his expeditions.

- On Celtic Tides, One man's journey (1999), St Martins Press. ISBN 0-312-20508-2 about his record-breaking circumnavigation of Ireland
- Southern Exposure, a solo sea kayaking journey around New Zealand's South Island (2003), The Globe Pequot Press. ISBN 0-7627-2595-8 about his solo circumnavigation of New Zealand's South Island.

== Awards and honors ==
- 2000 National Outdoor Book Award (Outdoor Literature category), On Celtic Tides
- 2003 National Outdoor Book Award (History/Biography category), Southern Exposure
- 2004 Banff Mountain Book Festival (Grand Prize), Southern Exposure
