= Christopher Ketcham =

Christopher Ketcham is an American journalist.

In 2019, Ketcham published the book This Land: How Cowboys, Capitalism, and Corruption are Ruining the American West. The book critiques the management of the 450 million acres of public lands in the United States, claiming that land is being systematically destroyed by commercial exploitation and government complicity.

In 2020, Ketcham published the book Flowers and Honeybees: A Study of Morality In Nature.

== Awards and honors ==
In 2002, Ketcham was a Livingston Awards finalist for his coverage of the 9/11 attacks in New York for Salon.com.

Ketcham's book This Land was a finalist in the natural history literature category in the 2019 National Outdoor Book Awards.
