= Dudley Edmondson =

American writer and photographer

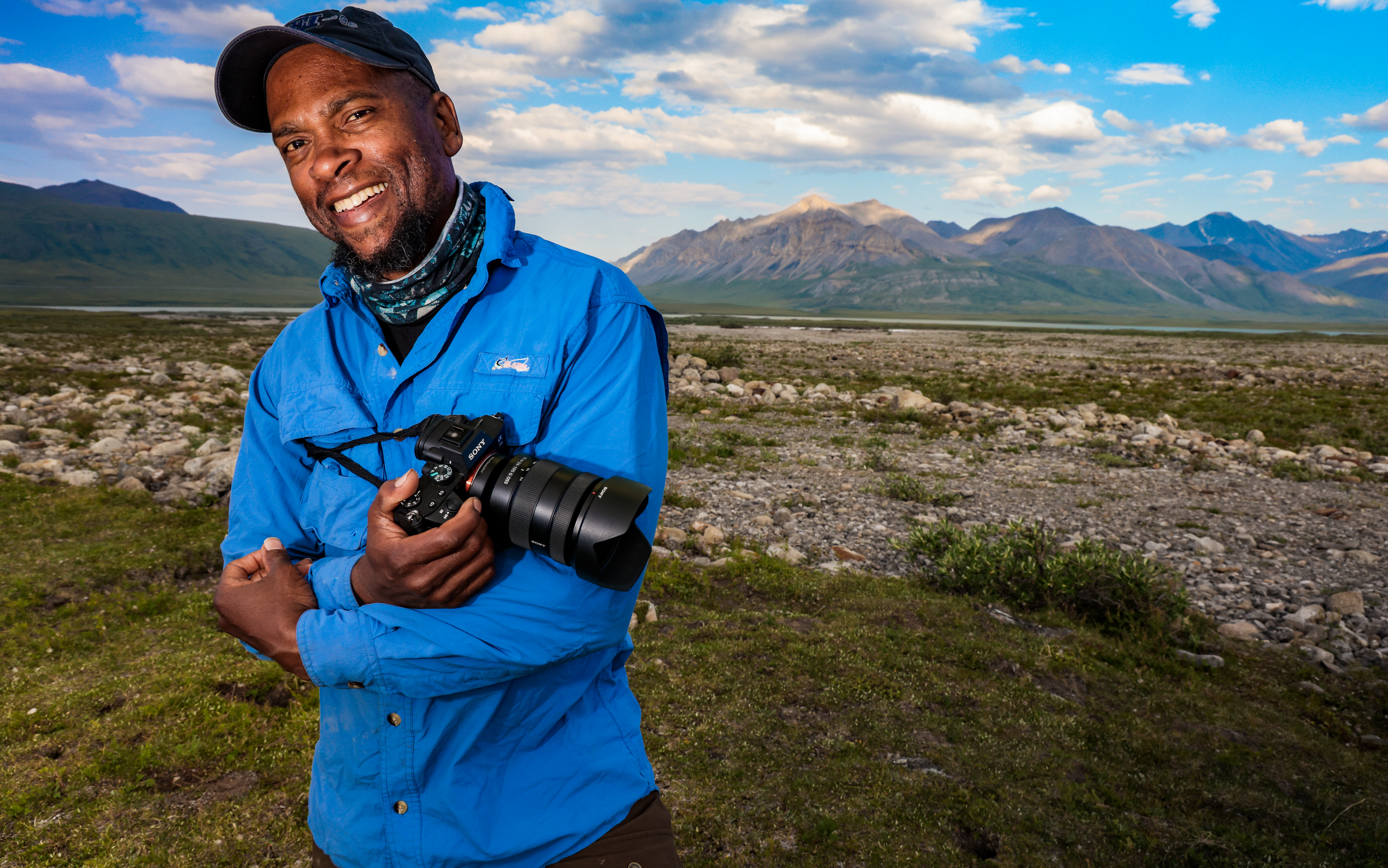
Author and photographer Dudley Edmondson in the Arctic Circle

Dudley Edmondson is an American writer, filmmaker, and photographer specializing in nature writing, social and environmental justice, and the outdoors. He currently lives in Duluth, Minnesota. His books include What's That Flower? (DK Press, London 2013) and The Black & Brown Faces in America's Wild Places (Adventure Publications, 2006) and People the Planet Needs Now: Voices for Justice, Science, and a Future of Promise (Adventure Publications, 2025). Much of Edmondson's recent work focuses on people of color in the outdoors, social and environmental justice, and the importance of representation in outdoor education and science communication. The Greater Seattle YMCA honored Edmondson by creating the Dudley Edmondson Fellowship for young adults, which is “designed to cultivate diverse leadership in the experiential and environmental fields.”

== Early life ==
Edmondson was born in Columbus, Ohio, to African-American parents who relocated from the South during the Great Migration. He first became interested in birding as a high-school senior when a teacher took him and other students on a birding trip, unusual for urban youth of color.

== Photography ==
Edmondson's photographs are widely published in bird encyclopedias and natural history field guides worldwide, including dozens of images in Bird: The Definitive Visual Guide by Audubon (DK Publishing) as well as in the American Museum of Natural History: Pocket Birds series, field guides by Stan Tekiela, and many other books.

As a photographer, Edmondson has also served as a judge for major competitions including the Epson International Pano Awards and the Australia Zoo's Crikey! Magazine.^{,}

== Bibliography ==
Edmondson is also an author; his first book, The Black & Brown Faces in America’s Wild Places: African-Americans Making Nature and the Environment a Part of Their Lives, discussed the challenges that Black, Brown, and Indigenous people face in science, nature, and the outdoors. In it, Edmondson interviewed 20 Black and Brown changemakers about their love of nature, the unique challenges they face in the conservation world, and why representation and diversity in nature and the outdoors matters.

Edmondson's What’s the Flower? was published by Dorling Kindersley as part of a series produced in concert with The Royal Society for the Protection of Birds.

== Filmography and Media Appearances ==
Edmondson's film work includes documentaries such as Blackwaters: Brotherhood in the Wild and The Cherry Man. Blackwaters saw Edmondson and a group of African-American men travel to the Arctic Circle and the Gates of the Arctic National Park and Preserve; the film, according to Peter Kaminsky, opinion columnist for the New York Times, is “an encounter with what it means to be a black man in America.” It received favorable reviews, including from Fly Fishing Magazine and other outlets. The film also won an IndieFEST Award of Merit in May 2024.

In 2022, Edmondson appeared in the PBS series America Outdoors with Baratunde Thurston. The episode is titled "Minnesota: A Better World." Edmondson has also appeared on Science Friday on National Public Radio, on The Weather Channel, and in The New York Times among other venues.

== Further Reading and Listening ==
- "Northern Voices: Dudley Edmondson Developing Environmental Justice For All". KAXE/KBXE Radio. May 2022.
- "Northern Waters Photography and Film Exhibit". Minnesota Marine Art Museum, Winona, Minnesota, Sept. 2021.
- "This Land is Your Land?" The Nature Conservancy. July 2020.
- "Editorial: A Birding Interview with Dudley Edmondson" (PDF). Birding. Sept./Oct. 2007. American Birding Association.
- "National Parks Should Be a Refuge for All Americans". NPR News & Notes. 2006.
- “Dudley Edmondson on Black Outdoor Role Models.” Birdnote. 2023.
- “Birding and Nature Photography with Dudley Edmondson” Uncommon Path REI Podcast 2024.
- “The Realities of Being a Black Birdwatcher.” CNN 2020.
