= Neal Petersen =

South African yacht racer

Neal Petersen is a South African solo racing yachtsman, author of Journey of a Hope Merchant, and the subject of a PBS documentary. Petersen completed a nine month single-handed yacht race around the world alone in a small yacht, which he designed and built himself. "He became the first black sailor to race solo around the world."

== Books ==
He has published two books: No Barriers was published in 1994. His second book, Journey of a Hope Merchant: From Apartheid to the Elite World of Solo Yacht Racing, was published in 2004. Both books describe his yachting career, with No Barriers concentrating on his first journey from South Africa to Europe. Journey of a Hope Merchant won the 2005 National Outdoor Book Award (History/Biography category).

== Personal life ==
Petersen was born physically disabled and impoverished in apartheid-era South Africa, and learnt to sail in the waters around Cape Town.
