= Kevin Schafer =

American photographer and writer (born 1951)

Kevin Schafer (born 1951) is an American photographer and writer.

== Biography ==
Kevin Schafer was trained to become an ornithologist, and for several years studied seabirds on California's Farallon Islands. He began his photographic career as assistant to author and National Geographic photographer Galen Rowell. In 1997 Schafer received the Gerald Durrell award from the Wildlife Photographer of the Year competition, for his photographs of endangered species. In 2007 he was named an Outstanding Nature Photographer of the Year by the North American Nature Photographers Association.

In 1996 he published Costa Rica: Forests of Eden with Rizzoli, followed in 2000 by Penguin Planet which was published by NorthWord and received a National Outdoor Book Award. Other books include Falkland Islands: Between the Wind & Sea and Living Light published by Bitterroot Press. Currently he lives in Seattle, Washington with his wife, artist and author Martha Hill.
