= Kim Heacox =

American writer and photographer

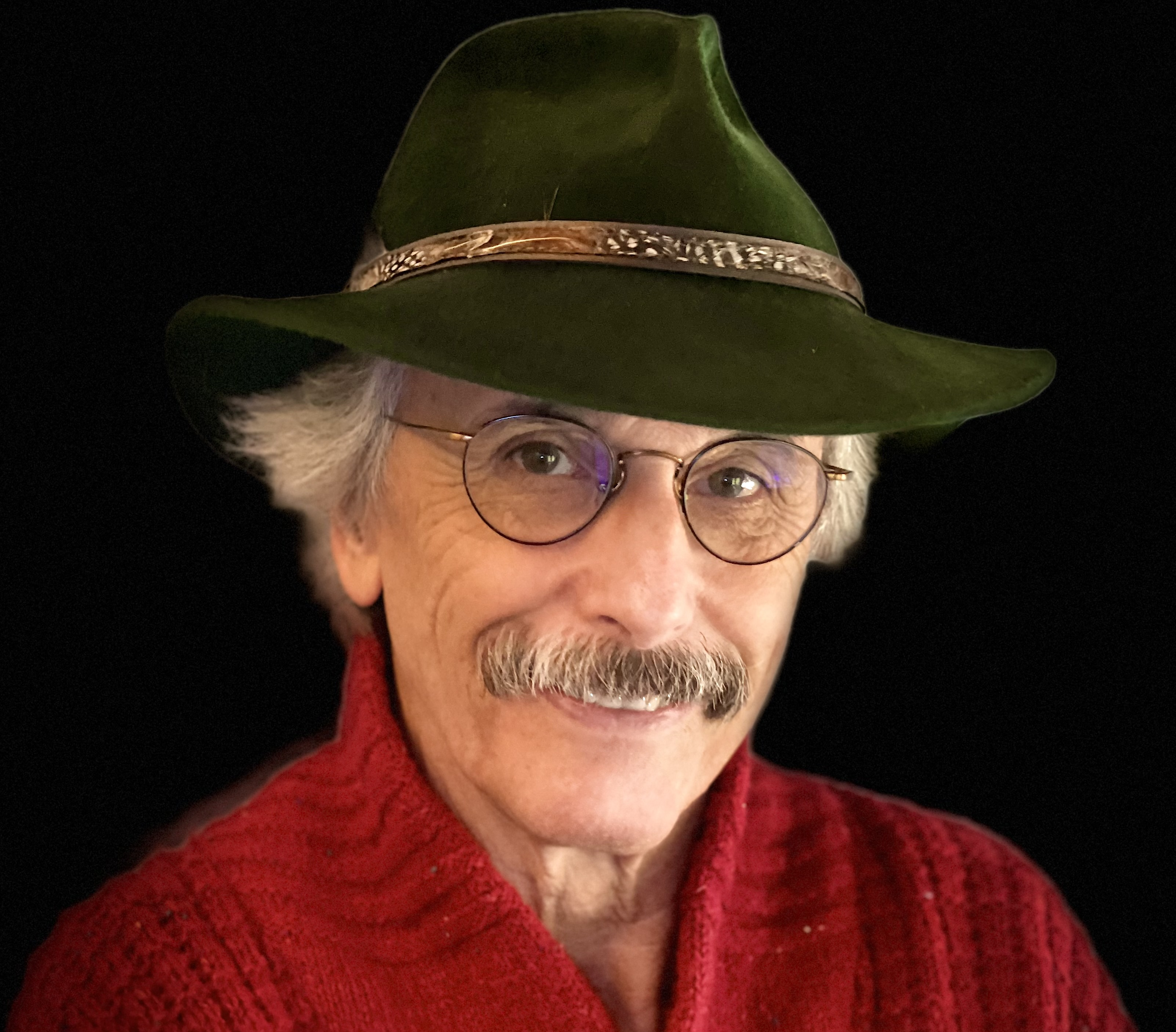
- Born: June 26, 1951 (age 75)
- Occupation: Writer
- Spouse: Melanie Heacox
- Writing career
- Genres: Memoir, biography, fiction
- Website: kimheacox.com

Kim Heacox is an American author, photographer, musician, and environmental activist living in Gustavus, Alaska, at the entrance to Glacier Bay National Park. He was born in Lewiston, Idaho and grew up in Spokane, Washington. Heacox is best known for two of his books, The Only Kayak, a memoir (2005, 2020), and Jimmy Bluefeather, a novel (2015), both winners of the National Outdoor Book Award, and for his opinion pieces in The Guardian that focus primarily on the climate crisis, global biodiversity loss, and threats to U.S. public lands. His most recent book, On Heaven’s Hill, is a literary novel author Kimi Eisele praised as “the kind of story the planet needs right now.”

Heacox first arrived in Alaska in 1979 as a park ranger in Glacier Bay National Monument (today Glacier Bay National Park and Preserve). His memoir, The Only Kayak (a PEN USA Western Book Award finalist), describes that first summer in Alaska. Heacox has authored 17 books, including five published by National Geographic. His novel, Jimmy Bluefeather (2015), was the first work of fiction in over 20 years to win the National Outdoor Book Award. He has written opinion-editorials for The Guardian, the Washington Post, the Los Angeles Times, the Anchorage Daily News, and the Juneau Empire. He appears in the 2009 Ken Burns film The National Parks and has been featured on NPR's Living on Earth (discussing his biography, John Muir and the Ice That Started a Fire).

In 1985 he began writing for National Geographic Traveler, a new magazine, where his 1987 article on Mount St. Helens won the Lowell Thomas Award for excellence in travel journalism. (He won the same award a second time, in 1990, for a feature article on Alaska's ABC Islands – Admiralty, Baranof & Chichagof – in Islands magazine). His first full-length National Geographic book, Visions of a Wild America (1996), explores the writings of John Muir, Aldo Leopold, Robert Marshall, Rachel Carson, Edward Abbey, Wallace Stegner and Marjory Stoneman Douglas, and the landscapes that inspired them.

Heacox was a professional nature photographer from 1984 to 2013. His images were sold around the world by the photo stock agencies Getty, DRK Photo, Peter Arnold and Accent Alaska. In 2000 he won the Daniel Housberg Wilderness Image Award for Excellence in Still Photography from the Alaska Conservation Foundation. In 2001 he served as the official photographer on the Harriman Alaska Expedition Retraced, organized by Smith College. Heacox's photography, and his essay, “The Politics of Beauty,” appear in a book about that expedition, published by Rutgers University Press (2005). His photographs have been published in Audubon, Orion, Outside and Sierra magazines, in National Geographic and Smithsonian books, and in The Guardian and the Wall Street Journal, among other publications.

A 2021 newspaper article argued that political systems must become long‑sighted if humanity is to face any kind of reasonable future.

== Awards ==
- The Only Kayak - the National Outdoor Book Award, 2020
- Jimmy Bluefeather - the National Outdoor Book Award, 2015, Banff Mountain Book Award finalist; French Prix Expression winner
- Daniel Housberg Wilderness Image Award, 2000
- In Denali - IBPA Benjamin Franklin Book Award, 1992
- The Lowell Thomas Award for excellence in travel journalism 1987 & 1990

== Bibliography ==
- On Heaven’s Hill (2023)
- The National Parks: An Illustrated History (2015); Heacox, Kim (2016). 2016 pbk edition. National Geographic Books. ISBN 978-1-4262-1559-9.
- Jimmy Bluefeather (2015, National Outdoor Book Award winner; Banff Mountain Book Award finalist; French Prix Expression winner)
- Rhythm of the Wild (2015) LCCN 2021-677549 ISBN 9781493016655; Heacox, Kim (April 2021). 2021 pbk edition. Rowman & Littlefield. ISBN 978-1-4930-4959-2.
- John Muir and the Ice That Started a Fire (2014); Heacox, Kim (April 2014). 2015 pbk edition. Rowman & Littlefield. ISBN 978-1-4930-0932-9.
- The Only Kayak (2020, National Book Award winner as an “outdoor classic”; 2005, PEN USA Western Book Award finalist) Heacox, Kim (2005). 2005 edition. Lyons Press. ISBN 1592287158. LCCN 2004063302. Heacox, Kim (2020). 2020 edition. Globe Pequot Press. ISBN 9781493049400. LCCN 2020931930.
- Caribou Crossing (2001)
- An American Idea: The Making of the National Parks (2001) LCCN 2001-45043
- Shackleton: The Antarctic Challenge (1999) LCCN 99-35125 ISBN 0792275365
- The Denali road guide: a traveler's guide to the wildlife and wilderness of Denali National Park (1999) LCCN 2007-279517
- Antarctica: The Last Continent (1998) LCCN 97-51932 ISBN 0792270614
- Alaska Light (1998, photography by author)
- Alaska’s Inside Passage (1997, photography by author) LCCN 97-70190
- Visions of a Wild America (1996) LCCN 96-18715 ISBN 0792229444
- In Denali (1992, Benjamin Franklin Science/Nature Book Award winner, photography by author)
- Iditarod Spirit (1991, photography by author) LCCN 91-71223 ISBN 1558680675
- Alaska’s National Parks (1990, photography by Fred Hirschmann) LCCN 89-81618 ISBN 1558680101
- Bush Pilots of Alaska (1989, photography by Fred Hirschmann; preface by Lowell Thomas Jr.; afterword by Jay Hammond) LCCN 89-83730 ISBN 1558680128
- California state parks (1987) LCCN 86-82748 ISBN 0937959073
