= Lars Jonsson (illustrator) =

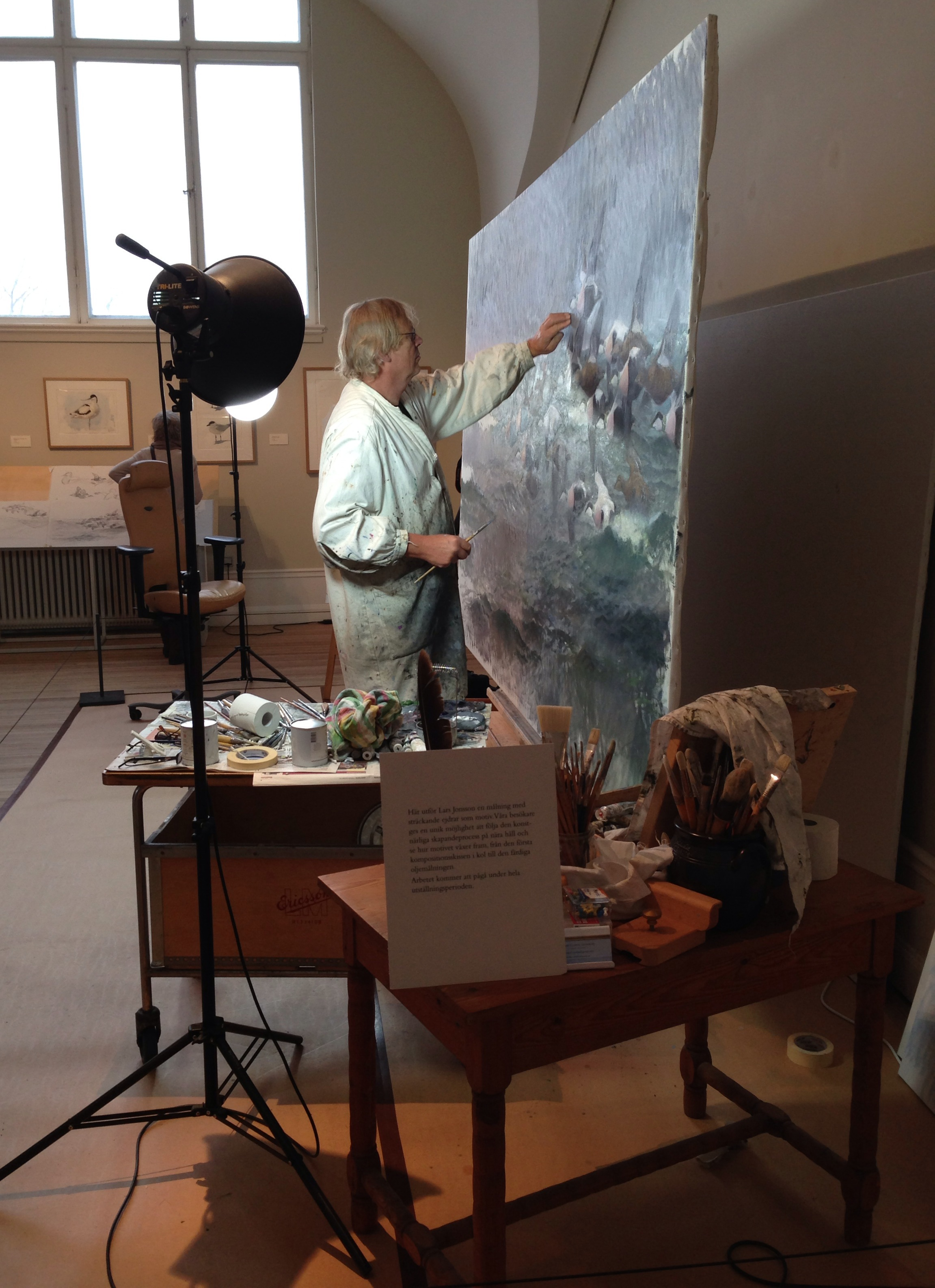
Lars Jonsson

Lars Jonsson (born 1952 in Stockholm) is a Swedish ornithological illustrator living in Hamra in the south part of the Swedish island of Gotland. He was appointed an honorary degree by Uppsala University in 2002.

== Bibliography ==
=== English/Translated Works ===
- Birds of Sea and Coast (1978) Penguin ISBN 0-14-063003-1
- Birds of Wood, Park and Garden (1978) Penguin ISBN 0-14-063002-3 - also translated in Dutch and German
- Birds of Lake, River, Marsh and Field(1978) Penguin ISBN 0-14-063009-0
- Birds of Mountain Regions (1979) Penguin ISBN 0-14-063013-9
- The Island: Bird Life on a Shoal of Sand, Christopher Helm ISBN 0-7099-1443-1
- Birds of the Mediterranean and Alps Croom Helm Ltd ISBN 0-7099-1413-X
- Birds of Europe: With North Africa and the Middle East Translated by David Christie (1992) ISBN 0-7136-5238-1 - also translated in Danish, Dutch, French, and German
  - 1999 edition Helm (1999) ISBN 978-0-7136-5258-1
- Birds and Light: The Art of Lars Jonsson Helm (2002) ISBN 978-0-7136-6405-8
- Where Heaven and Earth Touch: The Art of the Birdpainter Lars Jonsson Dr. M. Imhof (2008) ISBN 978-3-865-68412-7
- Lars Jonsson's Birds, winner National Outdoor Book Award (Design and Artistic Merit), Princeton University Press (2008) ISBN 978-0-691-14151-0

==== Articles ====
- The Image of a Bird, Birds, Spring 1993, Vol 14 No 5, pages 54–58

=== Swedish ===
- Fåglar i naturen. 5, Medelhavsländerna och Alperna Wahlström & Widstrand (1980) ISBN 978-9-146-12495-5
- Lommar : art- och åldersbestämning samt ruggning hos smålom Gavia stellata, storlom Gavia arctica, islom Gavia immer och vitnäbbad islom Gavia adamsii Sveriges Ornitologiska Förening (1992) ISBN 978-9-188-12401-2
- En Dag i Maj Atlantis ISBN 91-7486-909-4
- Lars Jonsson : fåglar och ljus Atlantis (2002) ISBN 978-9-174-86600-1
- Lars Jonssons Fåglar i Europa med Nordafrika och Mellanöstern Wahlström & Widstrand (2006) ISBN 978-9-146-17633-6
