= Terry Grosz =

American game warden (1941–2019)

Terry Grosz

Terry Grosz (June 22, 1941 – February 5, 2019) was an American game warden. He rose in the United States Fish and Wildlife Service to oversee a district in the Mountain West and Midwestern United States before retiring in 1998. After his retirement he published several books that included stories from his career.

== Early life ==
Grosz was born on June 22, 1941, to Ernie Grosz and Alberta (Dresden) Barnes in Toppenish, Washington. His family soon moved to Quincy, California, where he played several sports in high school and was president of the student body from 1958 to 1959 as a senior. He graduated from high school in 1959 and entered Humboldt State University. On February 3, 1963, he married Donna Larson, whom he had met in eighth grade. The following year, Grosz graduated from Humboldt, with a Bachelor of Science in wildlife science. He received a Master of Science two years later, in 1966.

== Career ==
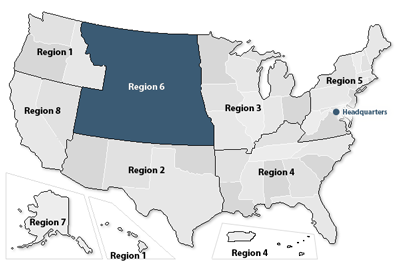
The regions of the Fish and Wildlife Service. Region 6 is highlighted.

From 1966 to 1970 Grosz worked as the fish and game warden of California before he was hired by the United States Fish and Wildlife Service, Bureau of Sports Fisheries and Wildlife. Grosz entered the Fish and Wildlife Service as a game management agent, soon becoming Special Agent. He worked first in the San Francisco Bay Area and moved to Colusa County, California, later. In California he was once fired upon while tracking poachers. He later claimed to have had "198 No. 4 lead shotgun pellets" in his body. During a stakeout in California, he busted an illegal snagging boat after being reeled in from the Eel River, where he had been waiting in a wetsuit.

In 1974 he received a promotion to senior resident agent in North and South Dakota, supervising agents and laws of the service. In 1989 the Feather River Bulletin reported that Grosz considered that role his "most satisfying". While there, he oversaw a reduction of annual violations from 800 to 150. Two years later Grosz reached the position of senior special agent, working in Washington, D.C., with endangered species and as a liaison to foreign powers for three years, until 1979. In that capacity he traveled around the world, including to the United Kingdom and Southeast Asia.

From 1979 to 1981 Grosz worked in Minneapolis as the assistant special agent in charge, before he was transferred to serve as the special agent in charge of Region 6. Region 6 was centered in Denver and spanned 750,000 square miles (1,900,000 km^{2}) across eight states. In 1988 Grosz visited Alberta as part of an effort to emphasize the need for preservation efforts in the region. In 1989 he organized anti-poaching raids in Colorado's San Luis Valley where 275 officials arrested numerous locals. The raids were accused of using excessive force and entrapment, which the officers denied. Grosz retired from the role in 1998. He wrote over 10,000 citations in his career.

== After retirement ==
After retirement, Grosz prepared one hundred and sixty four stories about his career, which he published in several books. The first was Wildlife Wars, published in 1999. It received the National Outdoor Book Award. He wrote a total of eleven books and a series that included some of his stories, titled "Wildlife Wars" was released on Animal Planet. He donated profits from books and television to St. Jude Children's Research Hospital.

Recognition included a recipient of the Guy Bradley Award in 1989, an honorary degree in Environmental stewardship from Unity College in 2002, and several other achievement awards.
