= Craig Luebben =

American author, climber (1960–2009)

- Born: May 20, 1960; Iowa
- Died: August 9, 2009 (aged 49); North Cascades, Washington State
- Education: Colorado State University
- Occupations: Rock Climber, Mechanical Engineer, Educator, Writer and Mountain Guide
- Spouse: Silvia Luebben (1997–his death)
- Children: Giulia
- Writing career
- Period: 1991–2006
- Genres: essays, journals, histories, scientific papers, biographies, textbooks
- Subjects: Mountaineering, rock climbing
- Notable work: Rock Climbing: Mastering Basic Skills
- Website: www.craigluebben.com

Craig Luebben (20 May 1960 – 9 August 2009) was an American rock climber and author.

Luebben was born in Iowa and moved to Colorado at age seven, where he cultivated his love of the outdoors. A climber since the early 1980s, Luebben wrote a number of climbing-oriented books, and designed the Big Bro wide-crack climbing protection device–now manufactured by Trango–as part of obtaining his degree in Mechanical Engineering from Colorado State University, and was a senior contributing editor for Climbing Magazine.

Luebben made many first ascents in the United States and abroad, including China, Madagascar, Puerto Rico and France. Luebben was a mountain guide with the American Mountain Guides Association and instructor.

"Craig was a 5.12 climber in that he could likely onsight any 5.12 on the planet."

== Death ==
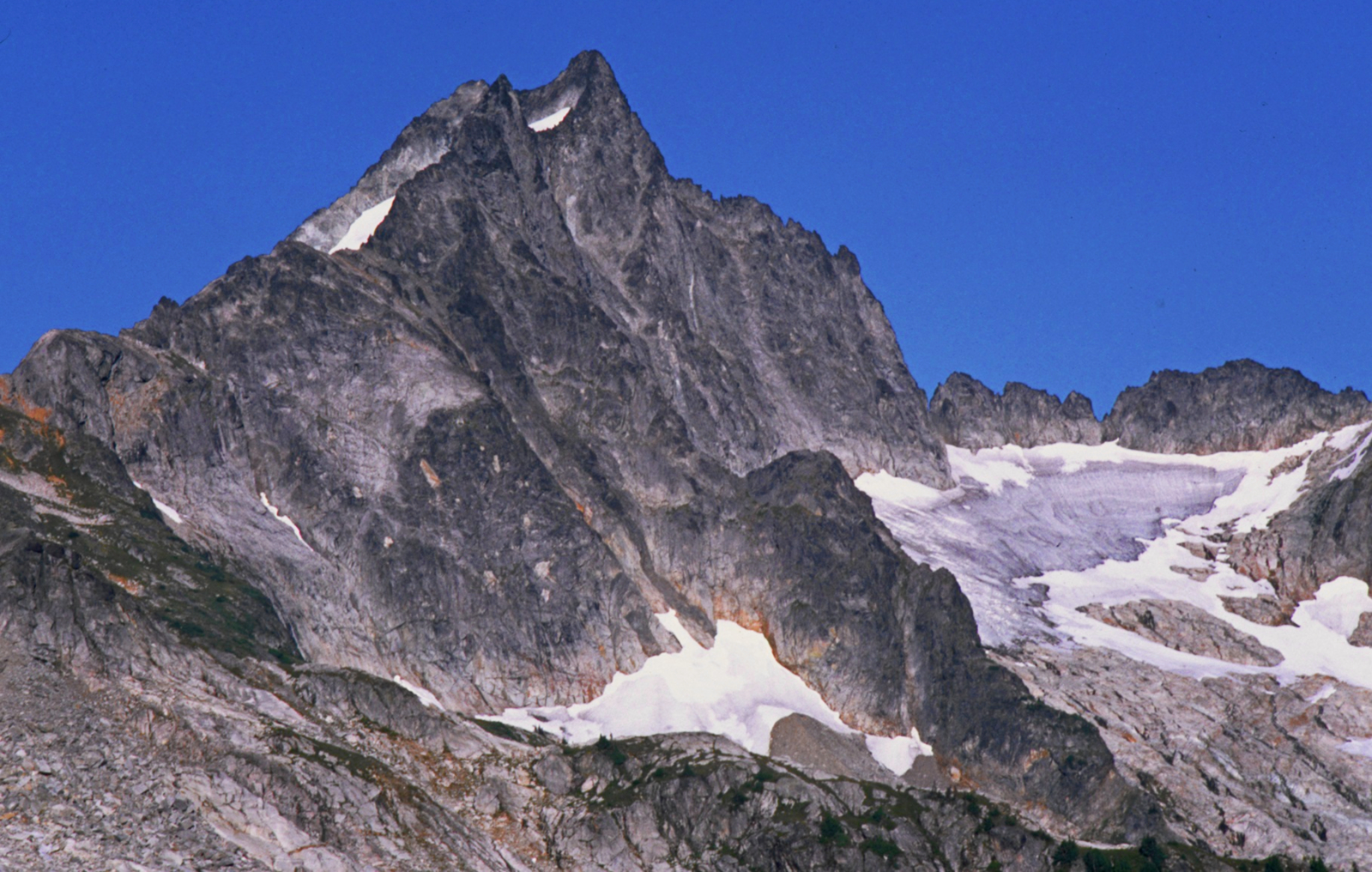
Mount Torment in North Cascades National Park

Craig Luebben was killed on August 9, 2009, in an accident while climbing on Mount Torment in the Cascade Range of Washington. A car-size block of ice calved off, taking Craig with it and resulting in a 30-foot (9.1 m) fall. While not struck by the initial block, Craig was pelted by debris as he hung from his rope.

After his death, the American Mountain Guides Association established the Craig Luebben Education Fund in his honor to provide scholarships for new mountain guides.

== Writing ==
Luebben's 2004 book, Rock Climbing: Mastering Basic Skills, won that year's National Outdoor Book Award (Instructional).

=== Published works ===
- A Rock Climbers Guide to Greyrock, Horsetooth Press, 1991, ASIN B000RJ3RFY
- Knots for Climbers (1st & 2nd editions), The Globe Pequot Press, 1995 and 2001, ISBN 0-7627-1218-X
- Advanced Rock Climbing, co-authored with John Long, The Globe Pequot Press, 1997, ISBN 1-57540-075-8
- How to Climb: How to Ice Climb!, The Globe Pequot Press, 1999, ISBN 1-56044-760-5
- How to Rappel!, The Globe Pequot Press, 2000, ISBN 1-56044-759-1
- Go Climb!, North South Publications, 2001, ISBN 0-7566-1943-2
- Betty And The Silver Spider: Welcome To Gym Climbing, Sharp End Publishing, 2002, ISBN 1-892540-22-3
- Rock Climbing: Mastering Basic Skills, The Mountaineers Books 2004, ISBN 0-89886-743-6
- Rock Climbing Anchors: A Comprehensive Guide, The Mountaineers Books, 2006, ISBN 1-59485-006-2
