= Johann Karl Rodbertus =

German economist and socialist politician (1805–1875)

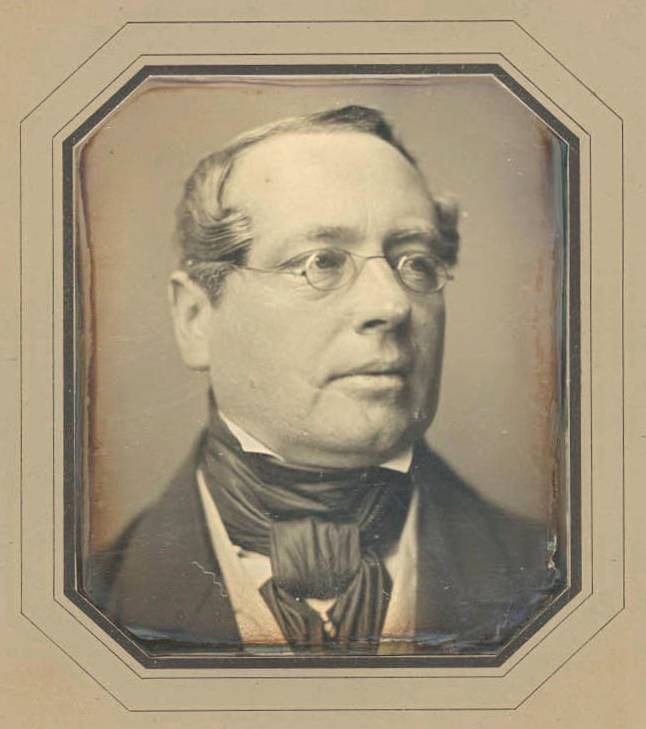
- Born: August 12, 1805; Greifswald, Sweden
- Died: December 6, 1875 (aged 70); Völschow, Germany
- Education: University of Göttingen; Heidelberg University; Humboldt University of Berlin
- Occupations: Economist, politician, writer

Johann Karl Rodbertus (August 12, 1805, in Greifswald, Swedish Pomerania – December 6, 1875, in Jagetzow), also known as Karl Rodbertus-Jagetzow, was a German economist and socialist and a leading member of the Linkes Zentrum (centre-left) in the Prussian national assembly. He defended the labor theory of value, as well as the view, which it implied, of interest or profit being theft. He believed that capitalist economies tend toward overproduction.

== Biography ==
Rodbertus was also known as Rodbertus-Jagetzow from the name of the estate of Jagetzow, in Pomerania, which he bought in 1835. Rodbertus was the son of a professor of law, and himself studied law at Göttingen and Berlin. From these studies he went on to Heidelberg, where he took up philosophy. He travelled extensively in the Netherlands, France, and Switzerland before returning to settle down on his newly purchased estate (Jagetzow).

Rodbertus served from 1827 to 1832 in the Prussian justiciary. By 1837, he had formulated his social platform, and in that year published Die Forderungen der arbeitenden Klassen. Elected to the National Assembly in 1848, he was Minister of Education in the Auerswald-Hansemann ministry for a fortnight, and in 1849 was a leader of the centre-left. After the defeat of the 1848 Revolution, Rodbertus did not participate in politics and the last twenty years of his life were spent in retirement.

== Theories ==
Socialism, as defined by Rodbertus, was to be a gradual evolution, hence his acquiescence in a monarchy, and his break with the Democrats as a political party. He regarded the social question as a purely economic one. His principal doctrines are these: the workman's share of the nation's industrial income tends constantly to decline; land rent and interest are the result of the exploitation of the working classes; the present shares in the distribution of wealth (rent, profits, interest, and wages) are not entirely the result of permanent, universal economic forces, but the result of historical evolution and the prevailing legal system; financial and commercial crises are due to a non-adjustment of production and consumption; the laborer's purchasing power is small and the capitalist and landlord classes, instead of increasing their consumption of luxuries, invest their savings in new factories, and in otherwise increasing the means of production, with the inevitable result that commodities of common consumption are produced in excess.

Rodbertus stated the labor theory of value as three connected propositions. First, only those goods that result from labor may be thought to be economic goods; other goods, like sunlight, which do not result from labor are natural goods and consequently have nothing to do with economics. Second, an economic good is solely the product of the labor; any other view of it is to be left to physicists. No part of the value of grain, for example, is to be attributed to sunshine or soil. Third, economic goods are products of the labor that went into their composition and the labor that created the instruments that enabled that production. The value of grain, for example, is not to be found merely in the ploughman but also in the work of those who manufactured the plough.

Eugen von Böhm-Bawerk thought that Rodbertus' exposition of the exploitation theory was superior to that of Karl Marx in profundity and coherence. Nonetheless, Böhm-Bawerk published his Capital and Interest, where he made his poignant criticism of the theory of exploitation and the labor theory of value on which it is founded, in 1890, several years before the publication of Volume III of Capital, most of which was written in the 1860s. There, Marx eliminates his simplifying assumption of Volume I that in capitalism commodities tend to exchange according to their values (i.e. labor-values). Without Volume III, it is not possible to have the complete picture of Marx's theory of capitalism, in particular his theory that commodities exchanged according to their production prices, which deviated systematically from their values, or according to modified prices of production if capitalists had to pay rent to landowners. For Marx, commodities tended to exchange according to their values only in non-capitalist or simple commodity production in which there is no wage labor (only independent producers) and land is freely available. Nevertheless, he used his sophisticated labor theory of value for the construction of his theory of surplus-value, which was his theory of exploitation. This was the esoteric part of his theory, which underlaid the exoteric part that explained equilibrium prices, wages, and rents. The global surplus-value produced was for him the foundation for profits on capital and rents on land. Böhm-Bawerk considered the labor theory of value fallacious, since it could only be valid in special cases. For example, he argued against Rodbertus that a nugget of gold that falls to earth embedded in a meteorite, and thus not having been produced by labor, would still fall within the purview of economic science.

== Works ==
- Die Forderungen der arbeitenden Klassen (The claims of the working classes, 1837)
- Zur Erkenntnis unserer staatswirthschaftlichen Zustände (Toward an appreciation of our economic circumstances, 1842)
- Soziale Briefe, addressed to Julius von Kirchmann (1850–51)
- Der Normalarbeitstag (The standard work day, 1871)
- Beleuchtung der socialen Frage (Some light on social questions, 1875)

The statement of his theory of crises, contained in his Soziale Briefe, has appeared in an English translation under the title of Overproduction and Crises (New York, 1898).

== See also ==
- Karl Marlo
- State socialism
- Socialists of the chair
