= Susan Freinkel =

American science journalist and author

Susan Freinkel is an American science journalist and author.

== Books ==
- Plastic: A Toxic Love Story (2011)
- American Chestnut: The Life, Death, and Rebirth of a Perfect Tree (2007)
