= Karl Marlo =

German economist (1810–1865)

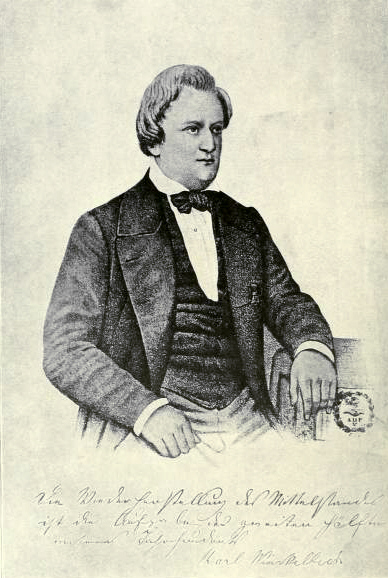
Karl Marlo

Karl Marlo, pseudonym of Karl Georg Winkelblech (11 April 1810 – 10 January 1865), was a German professor, scientist, chemist, and state socialist.

== Life ==
Marlo was born in Ensheim near Mainz. After finishing his studies in natural sciences and chemistry in Giessen, he became a private tutor in Marburg and, from 1839, a Professor of Chemistry at the Higher Trade School at Kassel, Hesse. He became deeply involved in the fate of the working class and became an exponent of socialist ideas. From 1843 on, he spent all his time and all his (considerable) talents to produce just a single book, a comprehensive book in four volumes about social reform, which was left unfinished upon his death in Kassel.

The four volumes, published between 1849 and 1859, were issued under the general title Enquiries concerning the Organisation of Labour, or, System of World Economy (Untersuchungen über die Organisation der Arbeit oder System der Weltökonomie). This work of this quixotic champion of the artisan cause was not widely read. It was not intended to bear immediate consequences. It was published in a period of public apathy, following the failed struggle for constitutional liberty of 1848. This work seemed to have been almost entirely forgotten when the German statesman and economist with socialist tendencies, Albert Schäffle, made favorable mention of this monumental work in his book Kapitalismus und Socialismus (Capitalism and Socialism), published in 1870.

His work has since been the subject of commentaries by the Scottish-Canadian economist John Rae, Hendrik Peter Godfried Quack (1834–1914), and the German economist Wilhelm Georg Friedrich Roscher, who described Marlo as "one of the most solid, moderate and conscientious of the socialists". In his book Marxism: An Historical and Critical Study, the historian George Lichtheim (1912–1973) describes Karl Marlo as "an utopian socialist".

== Thought ==
A conversation between Marlo and a German worker in Norway about the privations and insecurities of working-class life stimulated his interests in socialism and led him to study working-class conditions himself. Marlo's observations of industry and the effects of advancing capitalism led him to the conclusion that a process of proletarianisation was rapidly taking effect, that the smaller entrepreneurs were being crushed out by the great capitalists, and that under the developing industrial system wages were held down to subsistence level and the workers subjected to increasing risks of recurrent unemployment. These conclusions were apparently reached in isolation, with very little influence by any contemporary thinker.

Marlo believed that the French Revolution of 1789 was the starting point of a new era of human progress. Marlo believed that human history could be divided into two periods. The whole history of mankind up to 1789 had been dominated by the principle of paganism or monopolism. During this epoch it had been regarded as natural that the many should be sacrificed to the few, and that the few should monopolise the means of production. This regime of monopoly had taken successive forms in the institutions of slavery, serfdom, and wage-labor, which were all forms of exploitation of the many by the few. Christ had proclaimed many centuries ago the rival principle of human equality but this had not been translated into political terms capable of being applied until the French Revolution had proclaimed the Rights of Man. The Declaration of the Rights of Man and of the Citizen was then to be regarded as the starting-point of the era of true Christianity, and the task of the 19th century was to work out the social implications of the Christian principle.

At the Frankfurt General German Workers' Congress (August–September 1848), his views on the federal system for guilds and corporate institutions got endorsement. In these, he postulated that there were common interests between masters and journeymen, while the monied powers were their enemies. He demanded the creation of compulsory guilds and the creation of a social ministry for the governmental organization of labour. He proposed a comprehensive reform scheme for compulsory social insurance against old age, sickness and financial misfortunes, paid by individual contributions.

Marlo was in line with the criticism of socialists on industrial capitalism, and therefore he rejected liberalism. He also rejected communism because it fails to motivate the individual worker. He tried to find a common ground between the two systems that he called panpolism (the opposition of monopolism). In industrial states, the means of production should be common property, managed and organized by the state, while the produce of the labour of the individual worker should remain private property. He gave every man the right to dispose of his earnings according to his own wishes.

== See also ==
- Johann Karl Rodbertus
