= Jeffrey S. Cramer =

Jeffrey S. Cramer (born 1955) is the Curator of Collections at the Walden Woods Project's Thoreau Institute Library, managing the collections of the Walden Woods Project, the Thoreau Society, the Ralph Waldo Emerson Society, the Margaret Fuller Society, and the Scott and Helen Nearing Papers. He has written and edited 11 books about the works of such American literary figures as Ralph Waldo Emerson, Henry David Thoreau, and Robert Frost.

Jim Fleming of Wisconsin Public Radio said that Cramer "lives and breathes Thoreau. He may know more about the bard at Walden Pond than anyone else alive." You can see the passion that Jeffrey S. Cramer has for the bard at Walden Pond in the way that he describes his writing. Jeffery states "well, the writing, I mean the writing is just beautiful, the structure of the book, the prose is so magnificent...almost every line is poetry...". His passion is what makes his addition to literary discourse unique.

Cramer has received the National Outdoor Book Award (2004), the Boston Authors Club's Julia Ward Howe Book Award (2005) and the Umhoefer Prize for Achievement in Humanities (2011).
