= Patrick J. Lynch (biomedical illustrator) =

Patrick James Lynch (born 1953 in Monterey, California) is an American writer, artist, biomedical illustrator, and photographer.

He has written four editions of the Web Style Guide for Yale University Press with his co-author Sarah Horton. Web Style Guide has been published in eleven languages, and was named one of Amazon's top 10 web books in 1999. In a New York Times review, J. D. Biersdorfer describes the book as “an ‘Elements of Style’ for Webmasters.”

Lynch also writes and illustrates field guides with his friend and co-author Noble S. Proctor, an American birder, naturalist, and emeritus professor at Southern Connecticut State University. Their Field Guide to North Atlantic Wildlife was published by Yale University Press in 2005. Lynch's latest field guide is A Field Guide to Long Island Sound with color illustrations, published in 2017.
