= Dominic Gill =

Dominic Gill is a British adventurer, filmmaker and author of the book Take a Seat.

Born in Oxford, United Kingdom, and educated at Shrewsbury, Gill became a biologist who, at the age of 25, left the corporate world of environmental consulting to fulfill his dream as an adventurer and filmmaker. He set up shop creating and producing film and television content. Gill's first adventure film Take A Seat: Alaska to Argentina, in which he rode a tandem bicycle from top of Alaska to the bottom of Argentina, won Special Jury Prize at the Banff Mountain Film Festival in 2009 and has since been shown in over 400 cities worldwide. He also published the story of this journey in the book, Take A Seat.
