= Matt Ritter =

American journalist

- Born: Matthew Ritter; September 7, 1974 (age 51); California, U.S.
- Occupation: Professor
- Years active: 2002 – present

Matt Ritter (born 7 September 1974, in California) is an author, editor and botany professor at California Polytechnic State University at San Luis Obispo.

Ritter is a former Editor-in-Chief of Madroño, the journal of the California Botanical Society. He is the California coordinator of the Official National Register of Big Trees and a contributing author to the second edition of the Jepson Manual of California native plants, and to the Flora of North America projects.

== Education ==
Ritter earned his Bachelor of Science in Biology from the University of California, Santa Barbara in 1996, and his Doctorate of Philosophy in Biology from the University of California, San Diego in 2002.

== Career ==
Ritter is a sitting board member of The Wildlands Conservatory and the Urban Forest Institute.

He has written articles, manuals, and reviews on plant taxonomy, agricultural biodiversity, and other agricultural subjects.
