= Thirst trap =

Social media posting intended to attract attention

A man in a sexually suggestive pose taking a hotel bathroom selfie

A thirst trap is a type of social media post intended to entice viewers sexually. It refers to a viewer's "thirst", a colloquialism likening sexual frustration to dehydration, implying desperation, with the afflicted individual being described as "thirsty". The phrase entered into the lexicon from Internet slang that developed in the early 2010s. Its meaning has changed over time, previously referring to a graceless need for approval, affection or attention.

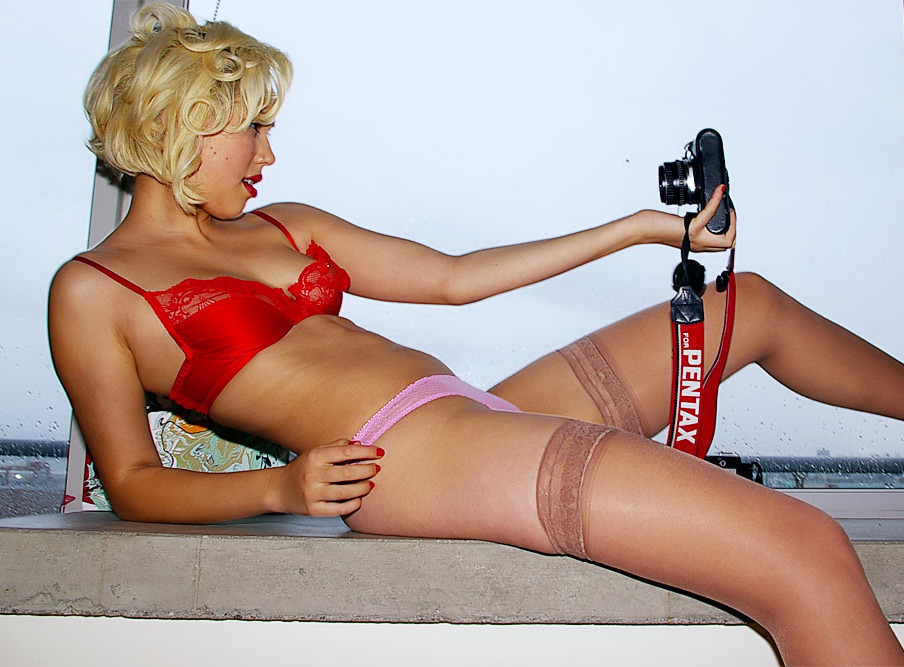
Young woman in lingerie photographing herself for a thirst trap

== History ==
The term thirst trap originated within selfie culture, though its precise origins remain unclear.

The modern usage of thirst trap emerged around 2011 on platforms such as Twitter and Urban Dictionary, coinciding with the growing popularity of Snapchat, Instagram, and dating apps like Tinder and Grindr.

In 2011, Urban Dictionary defined it as "any statement used to intentionally create attention or 'thirst'."

By 2018, the term had entered mainstream discourse, appearing in outlets such as The New York Times and GQ without the need for explanation.

== Usage of the term ==
Often, the term thirst trap describes an attractive picture of an individual that they post online.

Thirst trap can also describe a digital heartthrob. For instance, former Canadian prime minister Justin Trudeau has been described as a political thirst trap.

It has also been described as a modern form of "fishing for compliments".

== Motivation ==
Thirst trapping may be driven by a variety of motives. Individuals often seek attention through "likes" and comments on social media, which can offer a temporary sense of validation and improved self-esteem. It can also serve as an outlet for expressing one's sexuality or enhancing a personal brand. In some cases, sharing such content may provide financial gain. Others might post thirst traps to cope with emotional distress, such as after breakup, or to spite a former lover. Sharing a thirst trap has also been used as a way to connect in times of social isolation (e.g. COVID-19 pandemic).

From a physiological standpoint, endorphins and neurotransmitters like oxytocin and dopamine are released during sexual contact. It has been speculated outside of the academic setting that sharing and engaging with thirst traps may elicit similar pleasure responses.

== Methodology ==
Methodologies have developed to take an optimal thirst trap photo. Reporting for Vice magazine, Graham Isador found several of his social network contacts spent a lot of time considering how to take the best photo and what text they should use. They considered angles and lighting. Sometimes they made use of the self-timer feature available on some cameras. Often, body parts are put on display without being too explicit (e.g. bulges of male genitalia, breast cleavage, abdominal muscles, pectoral muscles, backs, buttocks).

Often, the thirst trap is accompanied by a caption. For instance, in October 2019, actress Tracee Ellis Ross posted bikini pictures on Instagram with a caption that included the message: "I've worked so hard to feel good in my skin and to build a life that truly matches me and I'm in it and it feels good. ... No filter, no retouch 47 year old thirst trap! Boom!"

On Instagram, #ThirstTrapThursdays is a popular tag. Followers reply in turn after a posting.

== Variations ==
"Gatsbying" is a variation of the thirst trap, where one puts posts on social media to attract the attention of a particular individual. The term alludes to the novel The Great Gatsby where the character Jay Gatsby would throw extravagant parties to attract the attention of his love interest, Daisy. "Instagrandstanding" is an alternative name for this.

"Wholesome trapping" has developed, where one posts pictures of more meaningful aspects of life, such as spending time with friends or doing outdoor activities.

== Criticism ==
Psychotherapist Lisa Brateman has criticized thirst traps as an unhealthy method of receiving external validation. This desire for external validation can be addictive.

Thirst traps can cause pressure to maintain a good physical appearance, and therefore cause self-esteem issues. Additionally, thirst traps are often highly choreographed and thus present a distorted perception of reality. The manufacturing of thirst traps can be limited when one enters a relationship or with time as the body ages.

In some cases, thirst traps can lead to harassment and online bullying. In April 2020, model Chrissy Teigen posted a video of herself wearing a black one-piece swimsuit, and she received a multitude of negative comments that constituted bullying and body shaming.

== See also ==
- Attention economy
