= Marlo Carter Kirkpatrick =

American author and photographer (born 1965)

Marlo C. Kirkpatrick (born 1965) is an American author and photographer.

== Biography ==
Kirkpatrick has a cum laude degree in journalism and English from the University of Mississippi. She became a freelance photographer in 1995, and since then received 175 of regional and national awards. She is married to Stephen Kirkpatrick who is also a photographer. Currently she have two books in print; Lost in the Amazon: The True Story of Five Men and their Desperate Battle for Survival and Mississippi Off the Beaten Path which have been reprinted seven times. She also co-authored five books with her husband including a children's book called Among the Animals.

== Personal life ==
She met her love, Stephen, in Peruvian Amazon and fell in love with him. Later on she returned to Machu Picchu in 1998 and had a wedding with him there. Since that time they have visited the rain forest of Peru, but also have been everywhere in South and North America and even in the Middle East.
