= Stan Tekiela =

American photographer

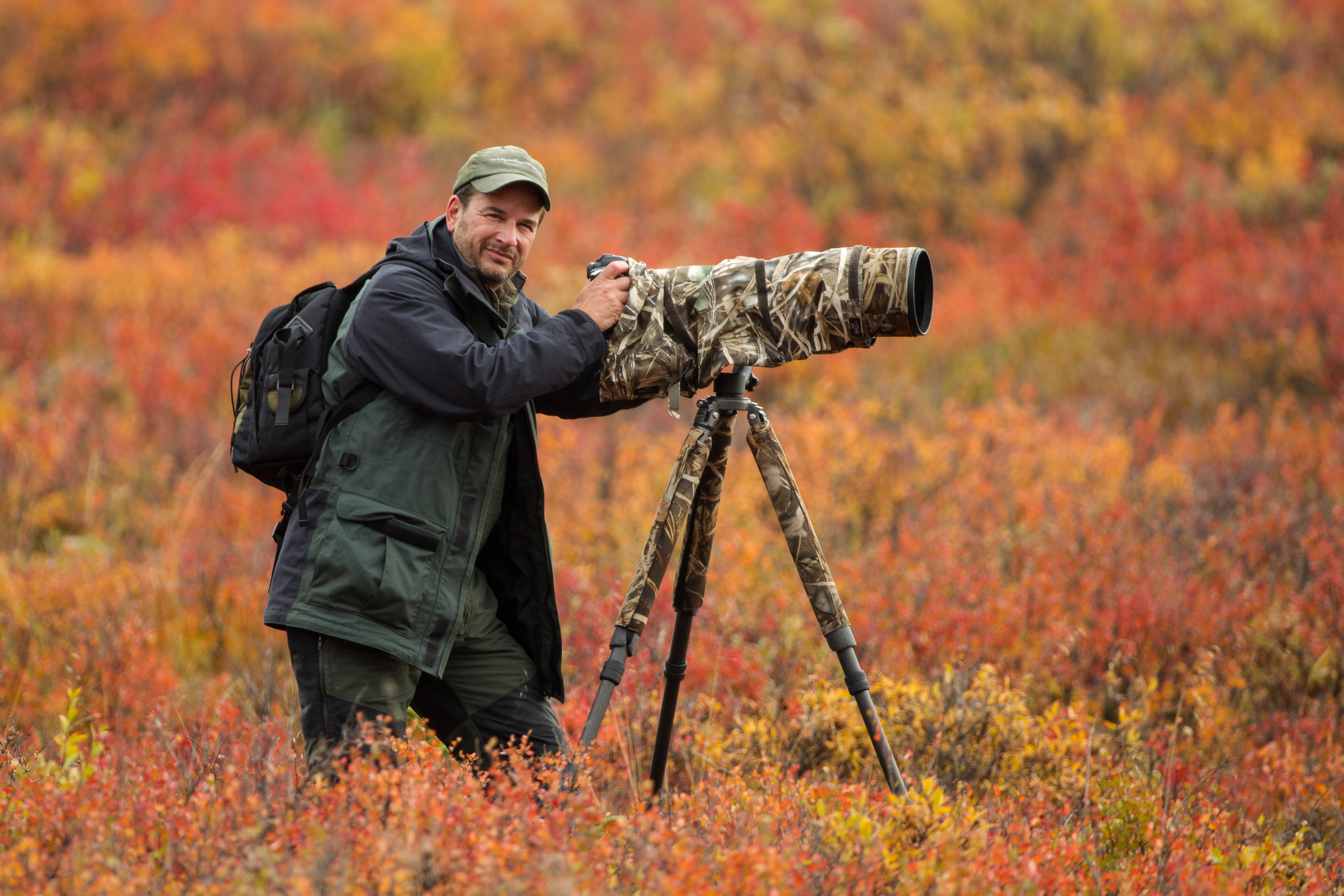
- Occupation(s): Naturalist, author, wildlife photographer
- Years active: 1990–present
- Website: NatureSmart.com

Stan Tekiela is a wildlife biologist, author, columnist, and wildlife photographer with a Bachelor of Science degree in Natural History from the University of Minnesota. He has been an active professional naturalist for more than 25 years and is a member of the Minnesota Ornithologists' Union, the North American Nature Photography Association, and Canon Professional Services. Stan studies and photographs wildlife throughout the United States, and has received various national and regional awards for his books and photographs. A columnist and radio personality, his syndicated column appears in more than 25 newspapers and he can be heard on a number of Midwest radio stations. He has made various books from birds, mammals, trees, wildflowers, amphibians and reptiles of some many different states from Minnesota to Texas to Florida. He gives talks and host wildlife tours.

He worked as a paramedic while attending the University of Minnesota. For many years he ran the Eden Prairie Outdoor Center in Eden Prairie, Minnesota.
