= Gregory S. Stone =

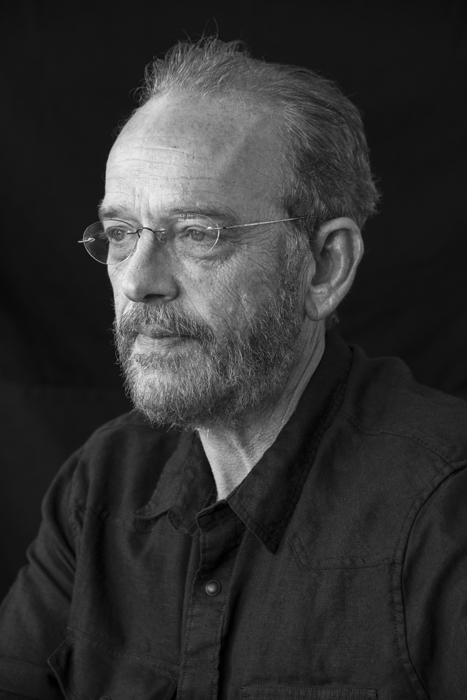
- Born: 1957 (age 68–69); Boston, Massachusetts, United States
- Education: College of the Atlantic, University of Rhode Island, University of the South Pacific
- Alma mater: College of the Atlantic
- Occupations: Ocean scientist, explorer, marine conservationist
- Organization: Pole to Pole Conservation (co-founder)
- Known for: Published researcher, undersea technology and exploration specialist
- Board member of: Chief Scientist for Oceans for DeepGreen Metals Inc.
- Awards: University of Rhode Island's Dean's Award for Distinguished Achievement, 2011. Peter Benchley Award for ocean solutions, 2011. Nominated for the Boston Globe's "Bostonians of the Year", 2008. National Geographic Society's Heroes award., 2007. Pew Fellowship in Marine Conservation, 1997. Postdoctoral award from the National Science Foundation for his work on marine science in Japan, 1997. John A. Knauss Marine Policy Fellowship, 1989. National Science Foundation and U.S. Navy Antarctic Service Medal, 1986. Wyland Foundation ICON Award, 2013. NOGI from the National Academy of Underwater Arts and Sciences, 2015. Boston Sea Rovers Diver of the year., 2014.
- Website: www.gregstoneocean.com

Gregory Schofield Stone (born 1957 in Boston, Massachusetts) is an ocean scientist, explorer, and marine conservationist. He has published research on marine mammals in Antarctica, on ice ecology, and on New Zealand's Hector's dolphin. Stone is also an undersea technology and exploration specialist, particularly in his use of deep-sea submersibles, and has produced a series of marine conservation films.

== Education ==
Stone earned a Bachelor of Arts degree in human ecology from the College of the Atlantic in 1982. He earned his master's degree in marine policy from the University of Rhode Island in 1989; and earned a Ph.D. in marine science in 1999 from the University of the South Pacific.

== Career ==
Stone is currently the Chief Scientist for Oceans for DeepGreen Metals Inc. formally he was Chief Scientist for Ocean and Executive Vice President for Conservation International and Senior Science Advisor for the World Economic Forum. Prior to that, he was the Vice President of Global Marine Programs from 2001 to 2009 at the New England Aquarium; and their Director of Conservation from 1993 to 2001. He was a Marine Biologist and Japan Program Manager at the National Oceanic and Atmospheric Administration from 1989 to 1993. He served as a Senior Editor for the Marine Technology Society Journal from 1997 to 2003.

=== Board Positions ===
His recent board memberships include: the Marine Stewardship Council (MSC), DeepGreen Metals Inc., Chair of the Phoenix Islands Protected Area Trust, Chair of Aquaspark, Chair of the Bermuda Underwater Exploration Institute Science Advisors, the Woods Hole Oceanographic Institute, Vice Chair of the Global Agenda Council on Oceans, World Economic Forum, and the New England Aquarium.

=== Conservation ===
Stone co-founded "Pole to Pole Conservation", an ocean conservation 501c3 nonprofit. The focus is to create sustainable and regenerative developments in a rapidly changing climate. The organizations work includes science, policy development, communications, and a scholarship program. Since 2000, Stone, in partnership with the government of Kiribati and NGO partners Conservation International and the New England Aquarium, has led the effort to create one of the world's largest marine protected areas around the Phoenix Islands in Kiribati. This project is among the first to use market-based mechanisms to conserve ocean biodiversity, a strategy that encourages and fosters economic opportunity for local communities, and was at the time of declaration the largest marine protected area in the world and the first to protect open ocean pelagic systems.

=== Expeditions ===
Stone has over 7,000 dives in all oceans and has spent 30 days in a saturation habitat underwater. He has led expeditions for National Geographic to Antarctica, Thailand, and the Pacific Islands. He has authored hundreds of publications; his work has appeared in National Geographic Magazine and the journals; Nature and Science, and he has written dozens of book chapters. He has also written four books, including - Underwater Eden: Saving the Last Ocean Wilderness (published by Chicago University Press in the fall of 2012), Oceans: Heart of Our Blue Planet (2011), Ice Island: Expedition to Antarctica’s Largest Iceberg (2003) which won the National Outdoor Book Award, and Soul of the Sea in the Age of the Algorithm (2017).

=== Awards ===
In 2011 Stone received the University of Rhode Island's Dean's Award for Distinguished Achievement and was the recipient of the Peter Benchley Award for ocean solutions. In 2008 he was one of the nominations for the Boston Globe's "Bostonians of the Year" and in 2007 was given the National Geographic Society's Heroes award. Stone was a recipient of the Pew Fellowship in Marine Conservation in 1997 and in 1990 won a postdoctoral award from the National Science Foundation for his work on marine science in Japan. In 1989, Stone received the John A. Knauss Marine Policy Fellowship and in 1986 the National Science Foundation and U.S. Navy Antarctic Service Medal. In 2013, Stone received the Wyland Foundation ICON Award, the NOGI from the National Academy of Underwater Arts and Sciences in 2015, and in 2014 was named the Boston Sea Rovers Diver of the year.

=== Publications ===
His frequent contributions to National Geographic Magazine have included the newly released article on Seamounts – “Mountains of the Sea”; “Phoenix Islands” (2011), “After the Tsunami” (2005), “Phoenix Islands: South Pacific Hideaway” (2004), “Deep Science” (2003) and “Islands of Ice: Exploring Antarctica’s Islands of Ice” (2001) He also presented a TED Talk: "Saving the ocean one island at a time.", and at Davos on the Ocean Health Index
