= Phyllis Reid Fenner =

American librarian, writer and anthologist

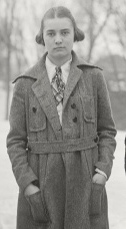
- Phyllis Reid Fenner at Mount Holyoke College in 1921
- Born: October 24, 1899
- Died: February 26, 1982 (aged 82); Manchester
- Occupation: Librarian

Phyllis R. Fenner (October 24, 1899 – February 26, 1982) was an American librarian, writer, anthologist, and storyteller. She was also a long-term companion of Clara Sipprell.

== Early life and education ==
Phyllis Fenner, born in Almond, New York on October 24, 1899, was the daughter of Viola Victoria Van Orman Fenner and William Lavern Fenner, who was a merchant. Her grandfather ran a general store in her hometown, which became the subject of her article "Grandfather's Store" that was published in the Reader's Digest in 1942.

She graduated from Almond High School, from Mount Holyoke College in 1921, and she received a degree in library science from Columbia University in 1934. She also studied at the New York University School of Retailing.

== Career ==
Fenner worked in Brooklyn at Loeser's Department Store, in Connecticut as a social caseworker, and in Virginia as a private school teacher. Beginning in 1923, Fenner was a librarian at Plandome Road School in Manhasset, New York. While there, she created what she considered the ideal type of library, among the various types of libraries that she identified and wrote about, called the Unlimited Service Library. She believed that librarians should see themselves as teachers, and not just custodians of books, and believed in creating environments where students wanted to come to explore books. She did this through storytelling, giving talks, using games to encourage participation, leading various clubs, and making the library a comfortable place to visit. She was quoted in the Library Journal in 1954 as having said that "… we will do most anything in my library, because I believe that if the library is really to serve, it must bring children and books together joyfully." She retired there in 1955. At St. John's University in Brooklyn, she taught a course in storytelling. Fenner was also a public speaker about library science.

She wrote one of the first books about elementary school libraries, Our Library (1939 and 1942), which received positive reviews from Time magazine and The New York Times Book Review. In 1945, she published The Library in the Elementary School: A Searching Discussion of Activities, Policies, and Possibilities. In 1957, she published Proof of the Pudding: What Children Read. She also published 34 young adult anthologies, including There Was a Horse, Stories from Folklore (1941), which was exhibited at the Metropolitan Museum of Art for its quality illustrations. She also wrote for Reader's Digest, reviewed books for Instructor (published by Scholastic Corporation), and was on the editorial board of Cademus Books Weekly Reader Club, and on the advisory board of Story Parade Magazine.

She was a member of the American Library Association, Progressive Education Association, New York State Teachers Association, Women's National Book Association, and Pen & Brush.

== Personal life ==
Sipprell and Fenner met in 1937, when Sipprell moved to Manchester, Vermont. In the 1960s, they had a house built by Harold Olmstead.

After retiring from her work as a librarian, Fenner moved permanently to Manchester. She then traveled extensively with Sipprell, who died in 1975. Sipprell asked for her ashes to be buried on a rock atop Manchester; on the engraved tablet with her name, there is also Fenner's name, and that of Jessica Beers, Sipprell's earlier companion.

Fenner was sick for many years before her death on February 26, 1982. Documents by and about Fenner are archived at the Williston Memorial Library at Mount Holyoke College.
