= Mark Skinner =

American politician

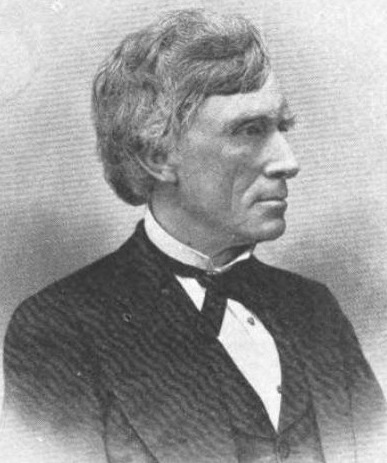

Member of the Illinois House of Representatives from the Cook County district
- In office December 7, 1846 – December 31, 1848 Serving with Francis C. Sherman, Jesse J. Everett
- Preceded by: Francis C. Sherman, Isaac N. Arnold, Hart L. Stewart
- Succeeded by: Francis C. Sherman, Philip Maxwell

United States Attorney for the District of Illinois
- In office 1844–1846
- Preceded by: Justin Butterfield
- Succeeded by: David L. Gregg

City Attorney of Chicago
- In office 1839–1841
- Preceded by: Samuel L. Smith
- Succeeded by: George Manierre

Personal details
- Born: September 13, 1813 Manchester, Vermont
- Died: September 16, 1887 (aged 74) Manchester, Vermont
- Party: Democratic
- Spouse: Elizabeth Magill Williams (m. 1841)
- Relations: Richard Skinner (father); Roger Skinner (uncle)
- Children: 5
- Education: University of Vermont; New Haven Law School
- Profession: Attorney

Mark T. Skinner (September 13, 1813 – September 16, 1887) was an American politician, attorney, and philanthropist from Vermont. The son of a Vermont politician and judge, Skinner decided to follow his father into the legal profession. He moved west to Chicago, Illinois, and was named City Attorney for Chicago and United States Attorney for the Illinois District. In 1846, Skinner was elected to a term in the Illinois House of Representatives. During the Civil War, during which he lost his only son, Skinner served on the United States Sanitary Commission and oversaw a similar organization in Chicago. After retiring from law and politics, he managed real estate and focused on charitable endeavors.

== Biography ==
Mark T. Skinner was born in Manchester, Vermont, on September 13, 1813. His father was Richard Skinner, at the time a member of the United States House of Representatives and the future Governor of Vermont. Skinner attended the Pittsfield Academy, studying under Chester Dewey. He was accepted to the University of Vermont in 1830 and graduated three years later.

Skinner followed his father's profession and studied law in Saratoga Springs, New York, under Esek Cowen and Nicholas Hill. He also attended the New Haven Law School for a year, studying under David Daggett and Samuel J. Hitchcock. Although he considered joining Hill as a partner, Skinner instead headed west to Chicago, Illinois. He was immediately admitted to the bar and started a practice, partnering with George A. O. Beaumont. In 1839, Skinner was elected City Attorney for Chicago.

In 1844 President John Tyler nominated Skinner to be United States Attorney for the District of Illinois. Tyler reappointed Skinner in February 1845. When James K. Polk succeeded Tyler in March, Isaac N. Arnold challenged Skinner for the appointment. After extended debate, Arnold and Skinner agreed to defer to a third candidate, David L. Gregg.

In 1846, Skinner was elected to the Illinois House of Representatives as a Democrat, serving one two-year term. Skinner formed a law partnership with Thomas Hoyne in 1847 that operated until 1851, when Skinner was elected Judge of the Cook County Court of Common Pleas. After his term expired, Skinner spent the rest of his life managing real estate.

Upon its founding, Skinner was named President of the Northwestern Sanitary Commission, which provided relief for sick and wounded soldiers of the Civil War. He held the position until 1864. In 1862, Skinner was also named to the United States Sanitary Commission and served until it was disbanded in 1866.

Skinner married Elizabeth Magill Williams on May 21, 1841. Their son Richard was killed during the Civil War at the Battle of Jerusalem Plank Road. They also had four daughters. Skinner served on the Chicago Board of School Inspectors, and Chicago's Skinner West and Skinner North schools were named in his honor.

Skinner also helped to organize the Young Men's Association of Chicago, which later became the Chicago Library Association. He was a co-founder and first President of the Board of Directors of the Chicago Reform School. He also donated to Manchester, Vermont the Mark Skinner Library, which operated until 2013, when a larger, more modern community library was opened and the Skinner library building was sold to a private developer. There are also two Chicago Public Schools which use his name (Skinner North and Skinner West.)

He served at times on the board of directors of the Chicago, Burlington & Quincy and Galena and Chicago Union Railroads. He was one of the original trustees of the Cook County Hospital and was a trustee of the Illinois Charitable Eye & Ear Infirmary. Skinner was a charter member of the Second Presbyterian Church and served on its board of trustees.

Skinner died on September 16, 1887, while visiting Manchester, Vermont and was buried at Manchester's Dellwood Cemetery.
