= Alta Rockefeller Prentice =

American philanthropist

- Born: Alta Rockefeller; April 12, 1871; Cleveland, Ohio, U.S.
- Died: June 21, 1962 (aged 91); New York City, New York, U.S.
- Spouse: Ezra Parmalee Prentice (m. 1901; died 1955)
- Children: John Rockefeller Prentice; Mary Adeline Prentice; Spelman Prentice
- Parent(s): John D. Rockefeller; Laura Spelman Rockefeller
- Relatives: See Rockefeller family

Alta Rockefeller Prentice (April 12, 1871 – June 21, 1962) was an American philanthropist and socialite. Her parents were Standard Oil co-founder John D. Rockefeller and Laura Spelman Rockefeller.

== Early life ==
Alta was born on April 12, 1871, in Cleveland in Cuyahoga County, Ohio. She was the third daughter of John Davison Rockefeller (1839–1937) and Laura Celestia "Cettie" (née Spelman) Rockefeller (1839–1915). Among her siblings was Bessie Rockefeller, who married psychologist Charles Augustus Strong; Edith Rockefeller, who married Harold Fowler McCormick; and John D. Rockefeller Jr., who married Abby Aldrich and Martha Baird. Her father was a founder of the Standard Oil Company and, later in life, became a prominent philanthropist.

=== Inheritance ===
In 1917, her father gifted 12,000 shares of Standard Oil of Indiana (today known as Amoco), worth approximately $9,000,000 (equivalent to $226,168,831 today), to a trust fund with Alta receiving the income except for $30,000 directed to her husband. By 1930, the original 12,000 shares had turned into 356,000 shares through stock splits and dividends paid with stocks.

== Married life ==
On January 17, 1901, Alta was married to Colonel Ezra Parmalee Prentice (1863–1955) by the Rev. Dr. William Faunce, the President of Brown University and former pastor of the Fifth Avenue Baptist Church. The wedding, which took place on the wide landing of the staircase in the main hall of her parents brownstone in Manhattan located at 4 West 54th Street, had originally been planned as an elaborate church wedding but was changed to a quiet affair at the Rockefeller home due to the recent death of Alta's young nephew, John Rockefeller McCormick, from scarlet fever. Prentice, an attorney, was the son of Sartell Prentice and Mary Adeline (née Isham) Prentice and his maternal grandfather was Pierpoint Isham, a justice of the Vermont Supreme Court and a direct descendant of Rev. James Pierpont, the founder of Yale University. His uncle, Edward Swift Isham, was the law partner of Robert Todd Lincoln. Together, Alta and Ezra lived at 5 West 53rd Street in Manhattan (bought by her father for the couple as a wedding present) and were the parents of three children:

- John Rockefeller Prentice (1902–1972), a Yale and Yale Law School graduate who became a cattle breeder.
- Mary Adeline Prentice (1907–1981), a 1934 Vassar College graduate who married Benjamin Davis Gilbert (1907–1992).
- Spelman Prentice (1911–2000), founder of the Prenalta Corporation which ran oil and gas operations.

She founded Alta House (c. 1900), a settlement house in Little Italy in Cleveland, Ohio, which is named in her honor.

In 1910, Alta and Ezra bought 1,400 acres (5.7 km^{2}) of land near Williamstown, Massachusetts. Elm Tree House, the Prentices' 72-room summer home on Mount Hope Farm, was completed in 1928 at a cost of $400,000 (equivalent to $7,500,000 today), and their estate became "the most valuable estate in the Berkshire Hills." In the 1930s and 1940s, several geneticists were employed by Ezra to develop more profitable farm animals, particularly cattle and poultry. At that time, Mount Hope Farm was one of the most outstanding experimental farms in the United States.

Alta died at Midtown Hospital in New York City in June 1962 at the age of 91, the last surviving child of John D. Rockefeller. She was interred at Dellwood Cemetery in Manchester Village, Vermont. She left her New York City brownstone to her neighbour, the Museum of Modern Art, who demolished it and built a new wing of the museum. Her Berkshires property was willed to New York's Lenox Hill Hospital. Shortly thereafter, Elm Tree House was purchased by its current owner, Williams College.
