= Joseph Wickham =

Joseph Wickham may refer to:

- Joseph Dresser Wickham (1797–1891), American minister
- Joe Wickham (1890–1968), General Secretary of the Football Association of Ireland
