= Pleissner Gallery =

Coordinates: 44°22′33.6″N 73°13′55.07″W

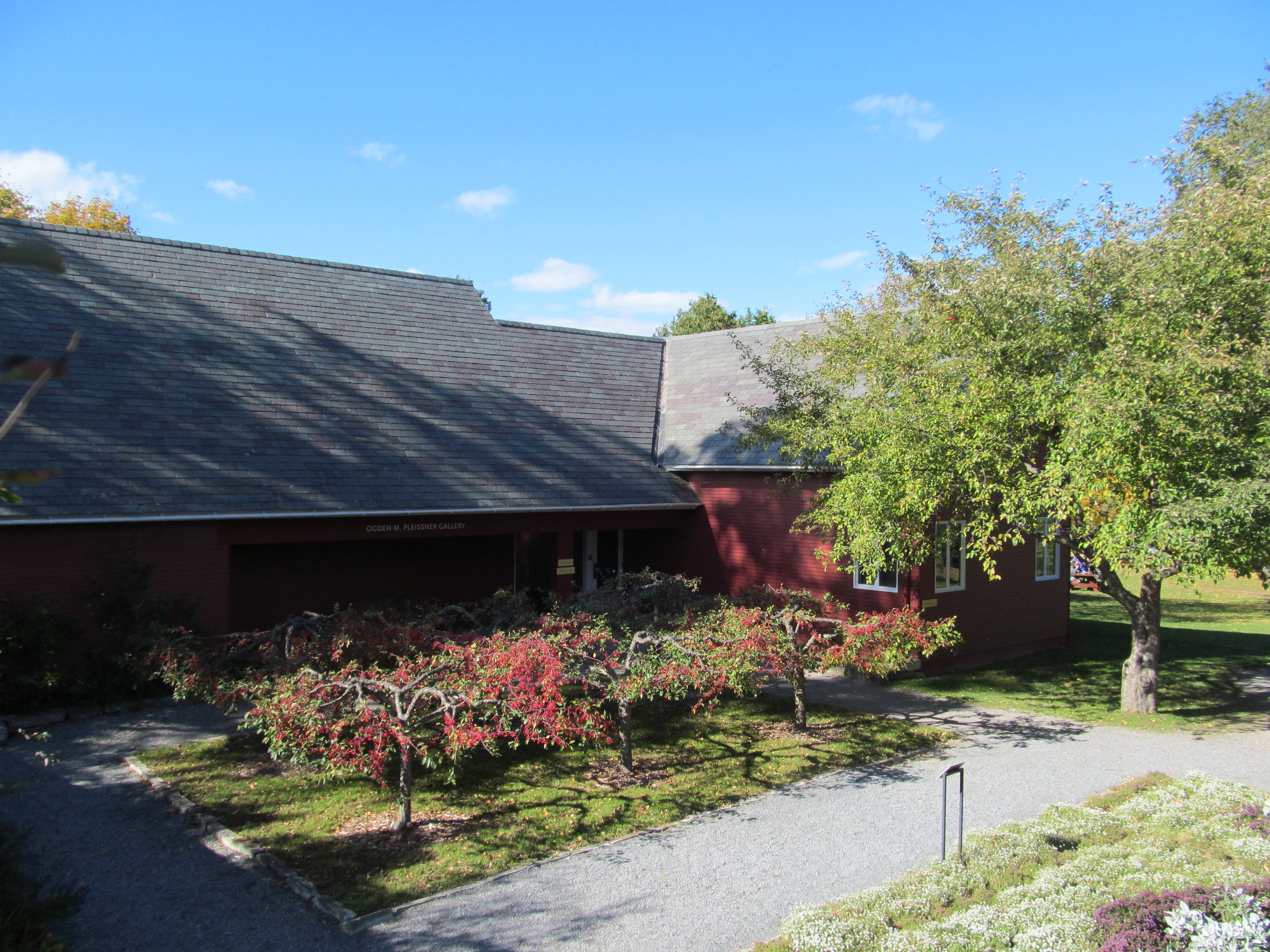
Pleissner Gallery

Pleissner Gallery is an exhibit building located at the Shelburne Museum in Shelburne, Vermont, United States.

== History ==
In 1986 the museum erected Pleissner Gallery to house the estate of Ogden Minton Pleissner (1905-1983), which he had bequeathed to the museum. Pleissner was a close friend of the Webb family who earned national recognition during his lifetime for his realist watercolor and oil landscapes and sporting scenes. The main gallery functions as a rotating exhibition space dedicated to displaying works from Pleissner's diverse portfolio, while the adjoining room houses a recreation of Pleissner's Manchester, Vermont, studio complete with canvases, brushes, and personal memorabilia.

The gallery features 40 of the museum's 600 Pleissner works in a rotating exhibition. The gallery shows watercolors and oil paintings from all periods of Pleissner's career, including early renderings, Western landscapes, works from war-torn France and England, and sporting scenes.

== Ogden Pleissner ==
Pleissner received his formal training at the Art Students League in New York City. During the 1930s he spent summers in Wyoming, building a reputation as an accomplished painter of Western landscapes. Pleissner served as a war artist for the U.S. Air Force and Life magazine during World War II, completing many watercolors in war-torn France and England. In later years he painted in Europe, Nova Scotia, New York City (where he maintained a winter studio), and Vermont. Pleissner was the recipient of many honors and awards, including a gold medal from the American Watercolor Society.
