= NGC 1009 =

Galaxy in the constellation Cetus

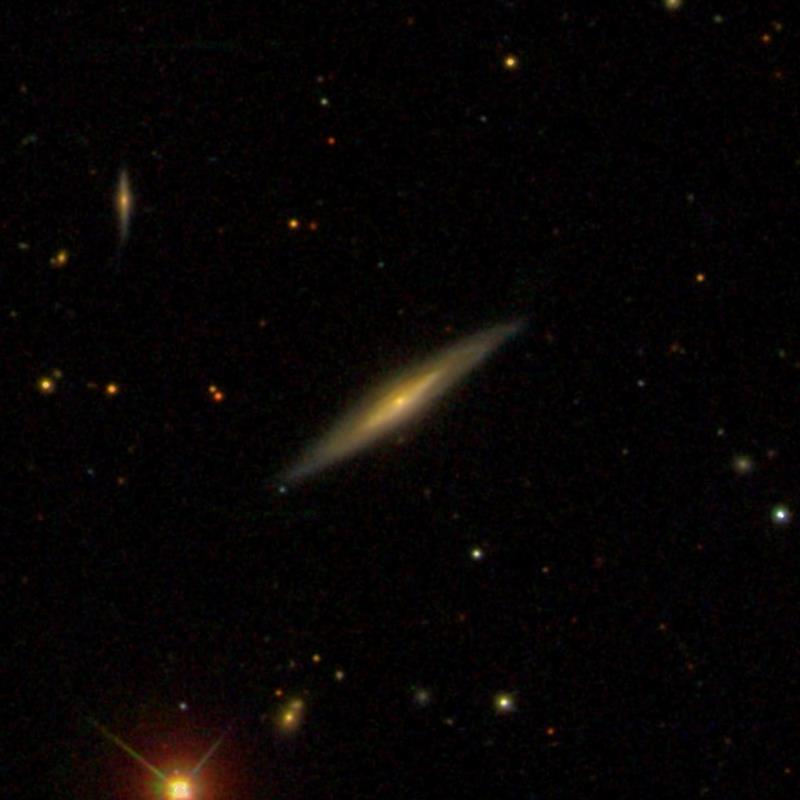

Observation data (J2000 epoch)
- Constellation: Cetus
- Right ascension: 02h 38m 18s
- Declination: +02° 18′ 36″
- Apparent magnitude (B): 15.4
- Surface brightness: 23.68 mag/arcsec2

Characteristics
- Type: Sb

Other designations
- UGC 2129, PGC 9995, 2MFGC 2087

NGC 1009 is a large spiral galaxy in the constellation Cetus. Its speed relative to the cosmic microwave background is 5,594 ± 24 km/s, which corresponds to a Hubble distance of 82.5 ± 5.8 Mpc (~269 million ly). NGC 1009 was discovered by American astronomer Edward Swift in 1886. The luminosity class of NGC 1009 is II and it has a broad HI line. To date, five non-redshift measurements yield a distance of 91.940 ± 3.045 Mpc (~300 million ly), which is just outside the distance values of Hubble.

== See also ==
- List of NGC objects (1001–2000)
- Lists of galaxies
- New General Catalogue
