= 1820 Vermont gubernatorial election =

- September 5, 1820
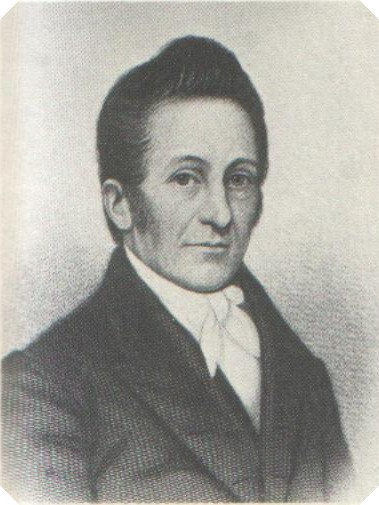
| Nominee | Richard Skinner |
| Party | Democratic-Republican |
| Popular vote | 13,152 |
| Percentage | 93.37% |
- County results Skinner: 70–80% 90–100%
Governor before election
Jonas Galusha
Democratic-Republican
Elected Governor
Richard Skinner
Democratic-Republican

The 1820 Vermont gubernatorial election took place on September 5, 1820. It resulted in the election of Richard Skinner to a one-year term.

The Vermont General Assembly met in Montpelier on October 12. The Vermont House of Representatives appointed a committee to review the votes of the freemen of Vermont for governor, lieutenant governor, treasurer, and members of the governor's council. With incumbent Jonas Galusha not a candidate for reelection, and the Federalist Party defunct, Democratic-Republican Richard Skinner was the only major candidate. The committee determined that Skinner had easily won a one-year term against only scattering opposition.

In the election for lieutenant governor, incumbent Paul Brigham was not a candidate for reelection and the committee determined that Democratic-Republican William Cahoon had been elected to a one-year term. Vote totals were not recorded, but a contemporary newspaper account indicated that only 1,007 votes were cast for scattering opposition.

Benjamin Swan was elected to a one-year term as treasurer, his twenty-first. Though nominally a Federalist, Swan was usually endorsed by the Democratic-Republicans and often ran unopposed. Vote totals for the 1820 election were not recorded, but an October 17 newspaper article indicated that Swan had been unanimously reelected, with no votes for any other candidates.

In the race for governor, the results of the popular vote were reported as follows.

== Results ==
1820 Vermont gubernatorial election
| Party | Candidate | Votes | % |
|---|---|---|---|
| Democratic-Republican | Richard Skinner | 13,152 | 93.37 |
| Write-in | | 934 | 6.63 |
| Total votes | | 14,086 | 100.0 |
