= 1822 Vermont gubernatorial election =

- September 3, 1822
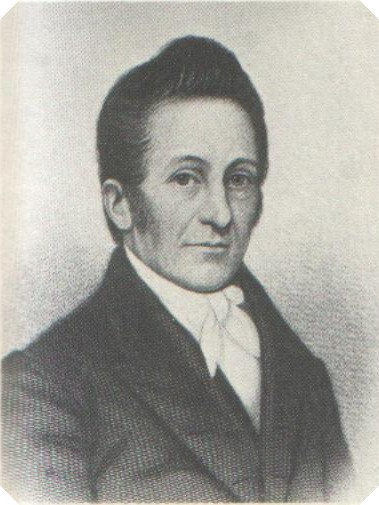
| Nominee | Richard Skinner |
| Party | Democratic-Republican |
| Popular vote | 11,520 |
| Percentage | 98.57% |
- County results Skinner: 90–100% No Data/Vote
Governor before election
Richard Skinner
Democratic-Republican
Elected Governor
Richard Skinner
Democratic-Republican

The 1822 Vermont gubernatorial election took place on September 3, 1822. It resulted in the election of Richard Skinner to a one-year term as governor.

The Vermont General Assembly met in Montpelier on October 10. The Vermont House of Representatives appointed a committee to review the votes of the freemen of Vermont for governor, lieutenant governor, treasurer, and members of the governor's council. Democratic-Republican Richard Skinner was the only major candidate. The committee determined that Skinner had easily won a third one-year term against only scattering opposition.

In the election for lieutenant governor, the committee determined that Democratic-Republican Aaron Leland had won election to a one-year term. A contemporary newspaper article reported the results as: Leland, 6,792 (61.4%); Ezra Butler, 1,838 (16.6%); William Hunter, 1,785 (16.1%); William Strong, 48 (0.4%); scattering, 604 (5.5%).

Benjamin Swan was unopposed for election to a one-year term as treasurer, his twenty-third. Though nominally a Federalist, Swan was usually endorsed by the Democratic-Republicans and even after the demise of the Federalists Swan often ran unopposed. Newspaper accounts of the election reported that Swan had received 7,986 votes (99.6%), with 34 votes (0.4%) scattering.

In the race for governor, the results of the popular vote were reported as follows.

== Results ==
1822 Vermont gubernatorial election
| Party | Candidate | Votes | % |
|---|---|---|---|
| Democratic-Republican | Richard Skinner (incumbent) | 11,520 | 98.57 |
| Write-in | | 167 | 1.29 |
| Total votes | | 11,687 | 100.0 |

=== By county ===
The following totals are incomplete. They represent all the votes that are vouched for by surviving records, and are therefore the minimum possible votes as opposed to grand totals.

| County | Richard Skinner Democratic-Republican | Scattering | Totals (incomplete) |
| County | Votes | Votes | Votes |
|---|---|---|---|
| Addison | 812 | 4 | 816 |
| Bennington | 606 | 6 | 612 |
| Caledonia | 767 | 9 | 776 |
| Chittenden | 245 | 0 | 245 |
| Essex | 137 | 0 | 137 |
| Franklin | 446 | 1 | 447 |
| Grand Isle | 112 | 0 | 112 |
| Orange | 1,189 | 1 | 1,190 |
| Orleans | 426 | 6 | 432 |
| Rutland | 1,106 | 7 | 1,113 |
| Washington | 317 | 0 | 317 |
| Windham | 1,095 | 9 | 1,104 |
| Windsor | 2,347 | 5 | 2,352 |
