= Richard Skinner (American politician) =

American judge

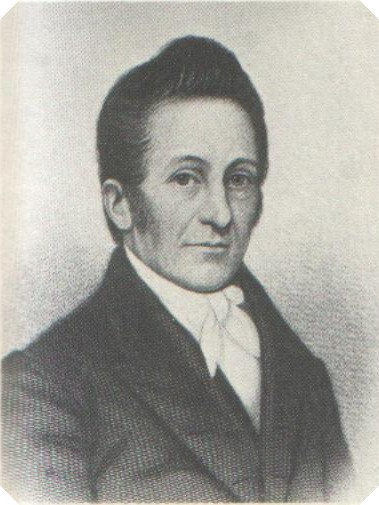

9th Governor of Vermont
- In office October 23, 1820 – October 10, 1823
- Lieutenant: William Cahoon; Aaron Leland
- Preceded by: Jonas Galusha
- Succeeded by: Cornelius P. Van Ness

Member of the U.S. House of Representatives from Vermont's at-large district
- In office March 4, 1813 – March 3, 1815
- Preceded by: Seat added
- Succeeded by: Charles Marsh

Member of the Vermont House of Representatives
- In office 1818–1819
- Preceded by: Joel Pratt
- Succeeded by: Elijah Littlefield
- In office 1815–1816
- Preceded by: Elijah Littlefield
- Succeeded by: Elijah Littlefield
- Constituency: Manchester

Personal details
- Born: May 30, 1778 Litchfield, Connecticut, U.S.
- Died: May 23, 1833 (aged 54) Manchester, Vermont, U.S.
- Resting place: Dellwood Cemetery, Manchester, Vermont
- Party: Democratic Republican
- Spouse: Fanny Pierpont
- Relations: Roger Skinner (brother)
- Children: 4 (including Mark Skinner)
- Education: Litchfield Law School
- Profession: Lawyer / judge / politician

Richard Skinner (May 30, 1778 – May 23, 1833) was an American politician, attorney, and jurist who served as the ninth governor of Vermont.

== Biography ==
Skinner was born in Litchfield, Connecticut, the son of Timothy Skinner and Susanna Marsh Skinner. Judge Roger Skinner was his brother. Richard Skinner completed preparatory studies and graduated from Litchfield Law School. He was admitted to the bar in 1800, and began a practice in Manchester, Vermont. He married Fanny Pierpont and they had four children, including prominent Illinois politician Mark Skinner. Among the prospective attorneys who learned the law in Skinner's office was Pierpoint Isham, who served as a justice of the Vermont Supreme Court from 1851 to 1856.

== Career ==
In 1801, Skinner became the state's attorney for Bennington County, a position he held until 1813. From 1805 to 1813, Skinner was probate judge for the Manchester district.

In the 1812 elections, Skinner was elected as a Democratic-Republican to the U.S. House of Representatives for Vermont's new created 5th District. He served a single two-year term (the 13th Congress) from March 4, 1813, to March 3, 1815. Skinner lost in the 1814 election to the 14th Congress and returned to Vermont to resume the practice of law.

Skinner became a Judge on the Vermont Supreme Court in 1815 and 1816; he succeeded Asa Aldis as chief justice in 1816, but declined reappointment to the post in 1817. He was a member of the Vermont House of Representatives in 1815 and 1818, serving as Speaker in the latter year.

In 1819, Skinner briefly returned to his former position of Bennington County state's attorney. The same year, he was elected Governor of Vermont, and served from 1820 until 1823, when he became the Chief Justice on the Vermont Supreme Court. Skinner held this position until 1828, when he retired from public life.

Skinner was interested in public education and served as president of the northeastern branch of the American Educational Society and a trustee of Middlebury College.

== Death ==
Skinner died in Manchester on May 23, 1833. He was buried at Dellwood Cemetery in Manchester.

Party political offices
Preceded by Jonas Galusha	Democratic-Republican nominee for Governor of Vermont; 1820, 1821, 1822	Succeeded by Cornelius P. Van Ness
U.S. House of Representatives
Preceded by New office	Member of the U.S. House of Representatives from Vermont's at-large congressional district March 4, 1813 – March 3, 1815	Succeeded by Charles Marsh
Political offices
Preceded by William A. Griswold	Speaker of the Vermont House of Representatives; 1818–1819	Succeeded by William A. Griswold
Preceded by Jonas Galusha	Governor of Vermont; 1820–1823	Succeeded by Cornelius P. Van Ness
