= Harvey Buel Spelman =

American politician (1811–1881)

- Born: 1811
- Died: October 20, 1881 (aged 69–70)

Harvey Buel Spelman (1811 - October 20, 1881) was a businessman and state legislator in Ohio. In 1850 he represented Summit County, Ohio in the Ohio House of Representatives. He supported women's rights.

Samuel Buell Spelman was his father. Harvey Spelman and his wife Lucy née Henry Spelman lived in Westfield, Ohio, Akron and then Cleveland. Their house was reportedly a stop on the Underground Railroad. He supported Anthony Comstock's work.

Laura Celestia "Cettie" Spelman Rockefeller, wife of John D. Rockefeller, was his daughter. Harvey Spelman moved to Brooklyn, New York after his daughter's 1835 marriage and died there.

He was an incorporator of the Franklin & Warren Railroad Company.
