= Isham Lincoln & Beale =

Former Chicago-based law firm

- Founded: 1859
- Defunct: 1988
- Headquarters: Chicago, Illinois

Isham Lincoln & Beale was a law firm based in Chicago, Illinois, United States. It was the law firm of Robert Todd Lincoln, the son of Abraham Lincoln. The firm operated until 1988.

== History ==
The law firm was founded in 1859 when Edward Swift Isham, the son of a justice of the Vermont Supreme Court, formed a partnership with James L. Stark. Incorporated as Stark & Isham, the firm quickly gained repute for their handling of commercial law. In 1872, the firm admitted Robert Todd Lincoln, the son of former President Abraham Lincoln, as a junior partner. William G. Beale followed as partner in 1886 and the firm became Isham, Lincoln & Beale.

== Merger ==
In 1986, the firm merged with Reuben & Proctor but maintained its name. Isham represented several major business clients including Commonwealth Edison, McDonald's, NBC, and CBS. Former Illinois Governor Richard B. Ogilvie became a partner after he returned to the private sector. On April 20, 1988, the firm dissolved following complications from the merge. At the start of the merge, 225 attorneys worked under the Isham name. By the end, only eight remained.

Isham Lincoln & Beale was the second-oldest legal firm in Chicago after Sidley Austin. Several of its attorneys left for Sonnenschein Carlin Nath & Rosenthal after Isham disestablished. It was thought to be the second-largest dissolution of a law firm after Finley, Kumble, Wagner, Underberg, Manley, Myerson & Casey.

== Notable partners ==
- Charles A. Bane
- Edward Swift Isham
- Robert Todd Lincoln
- Richard B. Ogilvie
- John Rowe
