= Manchester, Dorset and Granville Railroad =

The Manchester, Dorset and Granville Railroad was an intrastate railroad in southwestern Vermont. It ran from Manchester, Vermont to Dorset, Vermont, a distance of approximately 5 miles.

== History ==
The company was incorporated as a common carrier in 1902 as a subsidiary of the Norcross-West Marble Company, which had a contract to supply materials for the New York Public Library. The line was built in 1903 from a connection to the Rutland Railroad near the depot in Manchester north to a quarry in the southern part of the town of Dorset. The line was never completed to the main village in Dorset, nor was it completed beyond Dorset to Granville, New York. It primarily moved marble from the quarry to a finishing plant in Manchester, though passenger service was provided as well. Traffic on the line stopped in 1918 but was revived briefly in 1924 and 1925. The rails were removed in 1934. A nickname the locals have given it is "The Mud, Dirt and Gravel Line." Link label
