= Clara Sipprell =

Canadian photographer (1885–1975)

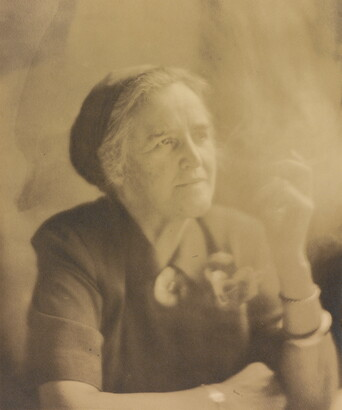
- Sipprell in 1965
- Born: Clara Estelle Sipprell; October 31, 1885; Tillsonburg, Ontario, Canada
- Died: December 27, 1975 (aged 90); Manchester, Vermont, U.S.
- Resting place: Dellwood Cemetery, Manchester Village, Vermont, U.S.
- Occupation: Photographer

Clara Estelle Sipprell (October 31, 1885 – December 27, 1975) was a Canadian-born, early 20th-century photographer who lived most of her life in the United States. She was well known for her pictorial landscapes and for portraits of many famous actors, artists, writers and scientists. Her photograph New York City, Old and New was the first artwork by a female artist acquired for the collection of the Museum of Modern Art, New York.

== Biography ==
=== Early years ===
Clara Estelle Sipprell was born in Tillsonburg, Ontario, Canada on October 31, 1885. She was the sixth child and only daughter of Francis and Fanny Crabbe Sipprell. Her father died before she was born, and her mother had to find various housekeeping jobs in order to care for the family on her own. Since her mother had trouble finding dependable work, Sipprell's older brothers lived for a while with their grandparents about fifty miles away from their home.

When they were old enough to work, three of her brothers moved to Buffalo, New York, and her brother Frank got a job as a photographer's assistant. The brothers sent money back to their mother and encouraged her to join them when she could. At some point before she was ten years old, Sipprell and her mother moved to Buffalo, and, except for travels, she stayed in the United States the rest of her life.

In 1902, Frank borrowed money from an older brother and opened the Sipprell Photography Studio in Buffalo. From the start his sister was fascinated with what went on at the studio, and soon she was acting as Frank's apprentice. At the age of sixteen she left school and became a full-time assistant, and over the next ten years she learned all of the technical aspects of photography in his studio. Later, Sipprell would credit her brother for both her technical and her aesthetic training, saying "He taught me all I seem to know. He taught me by letting me alone with my mistakes, and for that reason I never became conscious of the limitation of photography."

In her early years, Sipprell took photos of landscapes around Buffalo. While learning the technical aspects of the art, she experimented with a wide range of photographic media, including bromoil, gum, carbon and platinum prints. She also made a series of Autochome color prints and continued to prefer that process even after higher quality color film was created.

Because of the work of George Eastman and the establishment of the Eastman Kodak Company in Rochester, the city became an important center for American photography in the early part of the 20th century. Sipprell became involved in the activities of the Buffalo Camera Club, which, although its membership was closed to women at the time, allowed her to participate because her brother Frank was a member. In 1910, she exhibited her first photos at the Camera Club, one of which won second prize in the portrait competition.

Despite the fact that she could not be a member of the Club, Sipprell continued to show prints in their annual exhibitions. In 1913, she won six prizes at the show, more than any of the Club's actual members. The photographs she exhibited there attracted the attention of influential art and photography critic Sadakichi Hartmann (who at the time wrote about photography under the pseudonym "Sidney Allen"), and he wrote two very favorable reviews of her work. His interest, coupled with her own success, brought her invitations to speak at various photo clubs in New York City, and soon she was spending more time there than in Buffalo.

=== Rising fame ===
In 1915, Sipprell and long-time family friend and teacher Jessica Beers moved to New York, where they shared an apartment on Morningside Drive. The big city better suited Sipprell's growing bohemian tastes, which quickly came to include smoking cigars, and pipes; drinking bourbon, driving fast convertibles, and wearing capes, exotic jewelry and embroidered Slavic clothing. One friend recalled that she "did not make her work her life, but instead crafted a life that was a work of art."

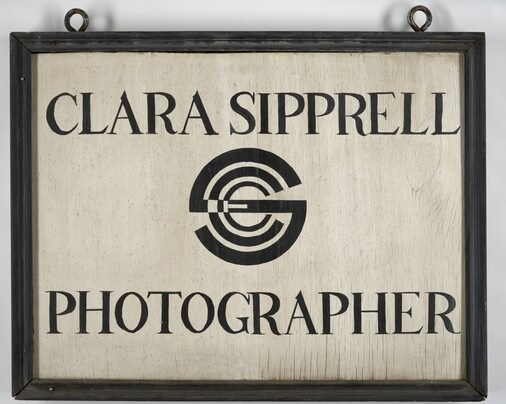
Clara Sipprell’s Business Sign

Within a few months Sipprell established a portrait studio and soon established a long list of clients due to her already well-known artistry. Over the next forty years she would photograph some of the most famous artists, writers, dancers and other cultural icons of the time, including Alfred Stieglitz, Pearl S. Buck, Charles E. Burchfield, Fyodor Chaliapin, Ralph Adams Cram, W. E. B. Du Bois, Albert Einstein, Robert Frost, Granville Hicks, Malvina Hoffman, Langston Hughes, Robinson Jeffers, Isamu Noguchi, Maxfield Parrish, and Eleanor Roosevelt.

As a portrait photographer, Sipprell sought to convey a sense of the whole person and what made each unique. She was a traditional pictorialist, interested in simple beauty and soft-focus imagery, and she kept this same aesthetic vision whether she was taking portraits, landscapes or still lifes.

In the late 1910s, Sipprell met a young Russian woman named Irina Khrabroff, who became her lifelong friend, traveling companion and, later, her dealer and business manager. When they first met Sipprell still shared her apartment with Beers, but when she moved out in 1923 Khrabroff moved in. Later that year Khrabroff married a man named Feodor Cekich, and the three of them lived together in the same apartment for many years.

In 1924, the threesome traveled to Europe, where Sipprell photographed the Adriatic Coast and, through connections with the Khrabroffs, members of the Moscow arts community. Later these same connections gave her access to many Russian expatriates whom she also photographed, including Countess Alexandra Tolstoy, Sergei Rachmaninoff and Sergei Koussevitzky. Two years later Sipprell and Khrabroff, without her husband, traveled again to Yugoslavia, and Sipprell made another series of photographs of the countryside and the people.

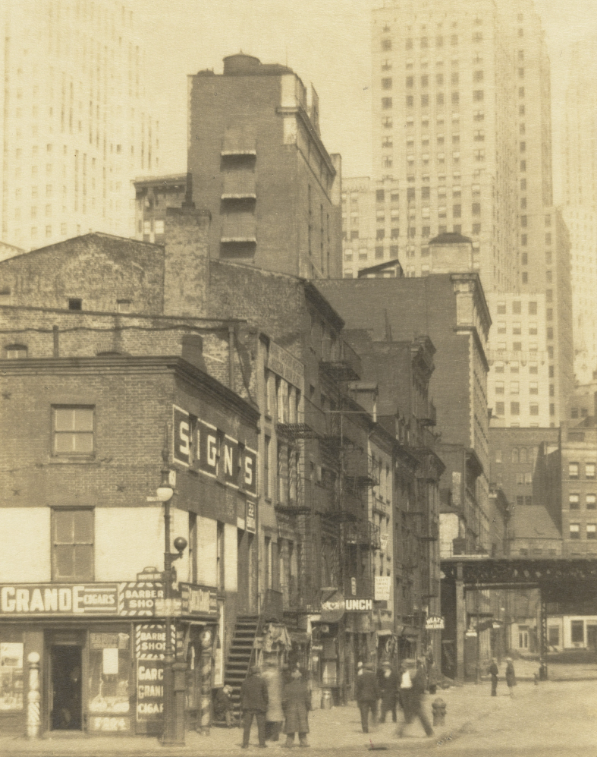
Clara E. Sipprell. New York City, Old and New. c. 1920

Throughout the 1920s, Sipprell continued to exhibit and have her work published, and in 1928 and 1929 she was given her first one-person shows, at San Jose State Teachers College. She also continued her friendship and living arrangement with the Khrabroffs, even after they had a daughter in 1927. However, around 1932 tension developed between Sipprell and her close friends over the rise of the Stalinist government in Russia. The Khrabroffs remained loyal to the ousted czarists, and they felt Sipprell's continued association with some who were sympathetic to the Stalinists was intolerable. By 1935 the friendship was over, and Sipprell started living on her own for the first time.

In 1932, her photograph New York City, Old and New became the first artwork by a female artist acquired for the collection of the Museum of Modern Art, New York.

=== Later life ===
In 1937, Sipprell moved to Manchester, Vermont, at the suggestion of Vermont poets Walter Hard and Robert Frost. Soon after she met Phyllis Reid Fenner (1899–1982), a writer, librarian, and anthologist of children's books. Fourteen years younger than Sipprell, Fenner soon became Sipprell's housemate and traveling companion. This relationship continued through the final thirty-eight years of Sipprell's life. In the mid-1960s, they had architect Harold Olmsted build them a house in Manchester, which included the first darkroom that Sipprell ever had in the same place she lived.

It is not clear if Sipprell's relationships with any of the women she lived with were sexual or even romantic, yet their length and stability indicate an extraordinary level of commitment.

Clara Sipprell died in April 1975 at the age of eighty-nine. Her ashes are buried in a plot near an outcropping of rock in Dellwood Cemetery. Attached to the rock is a small bronze tablet on which, in accordance with her wishes, are engraved her own name along with the names of Jessica Beers and Phyllis Fenner.

Over the course of her lifetime her work was shown in more than 100 photography exhibitions around the world. Major collections of her work are housed at the Amon Carter Museum of American Art and at Syracuse University.

== Gallery ==
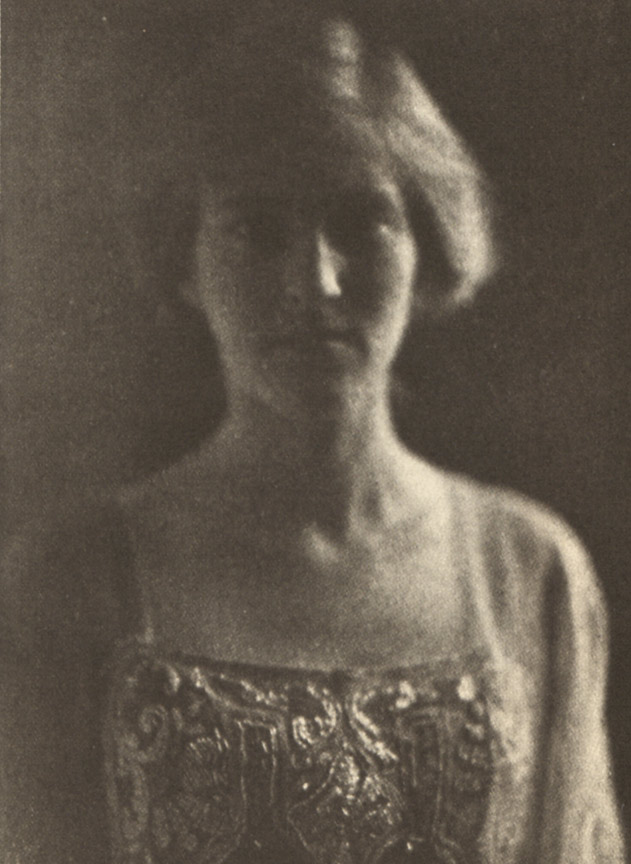
Decorative Study (1913)

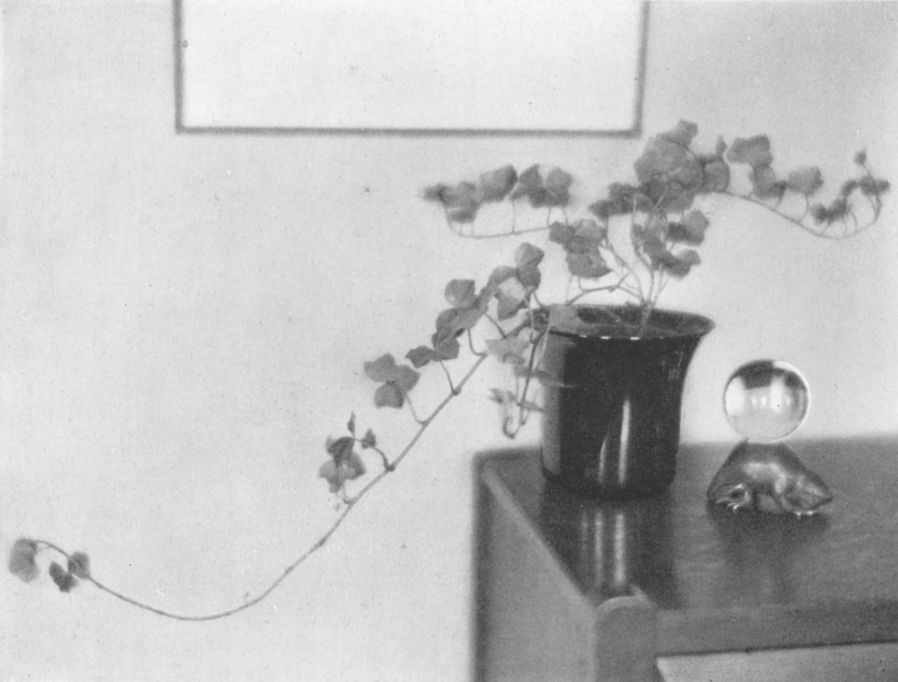
Ivy and Old Glass (1922)

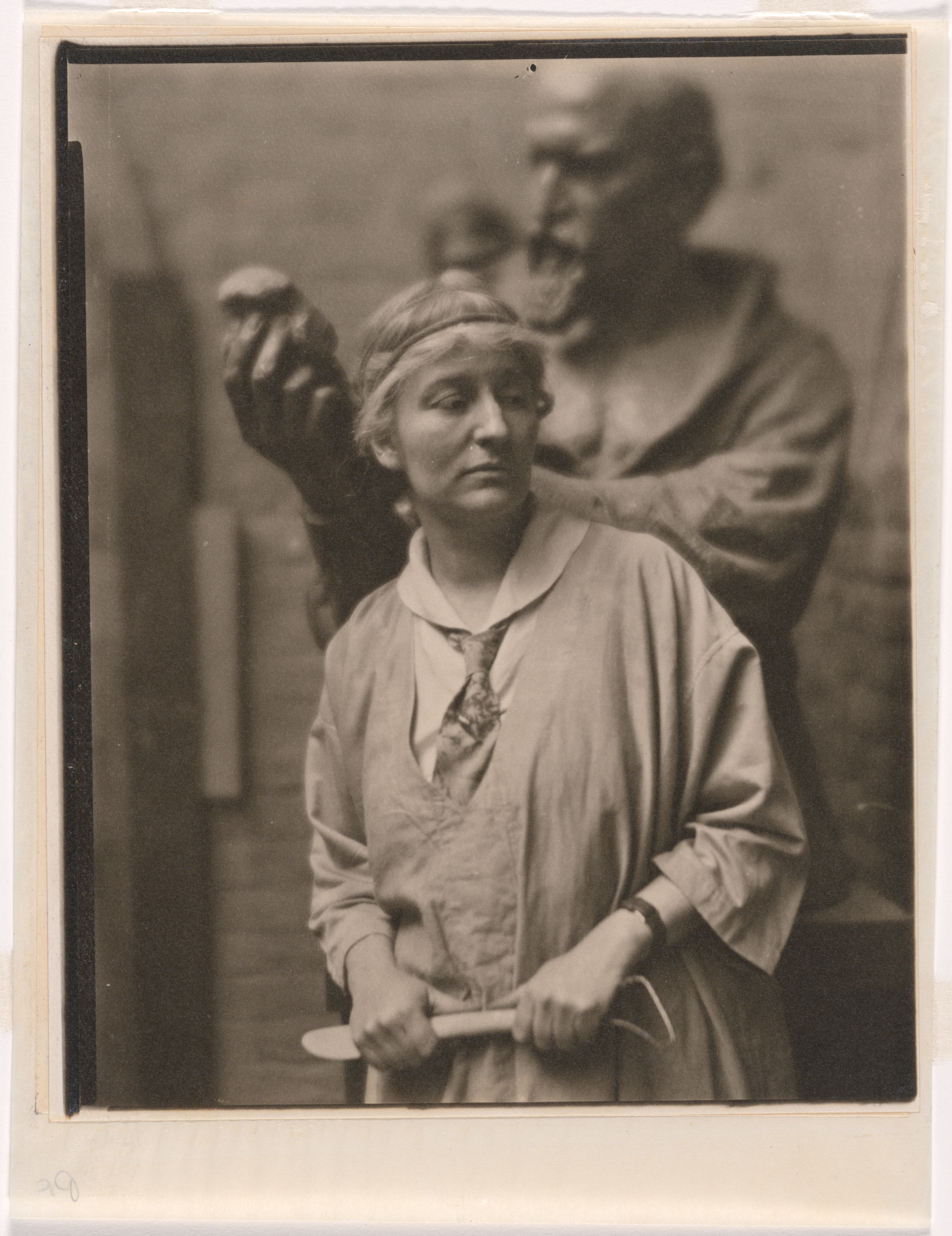
Sculptor Malvina Hoffman (1928)

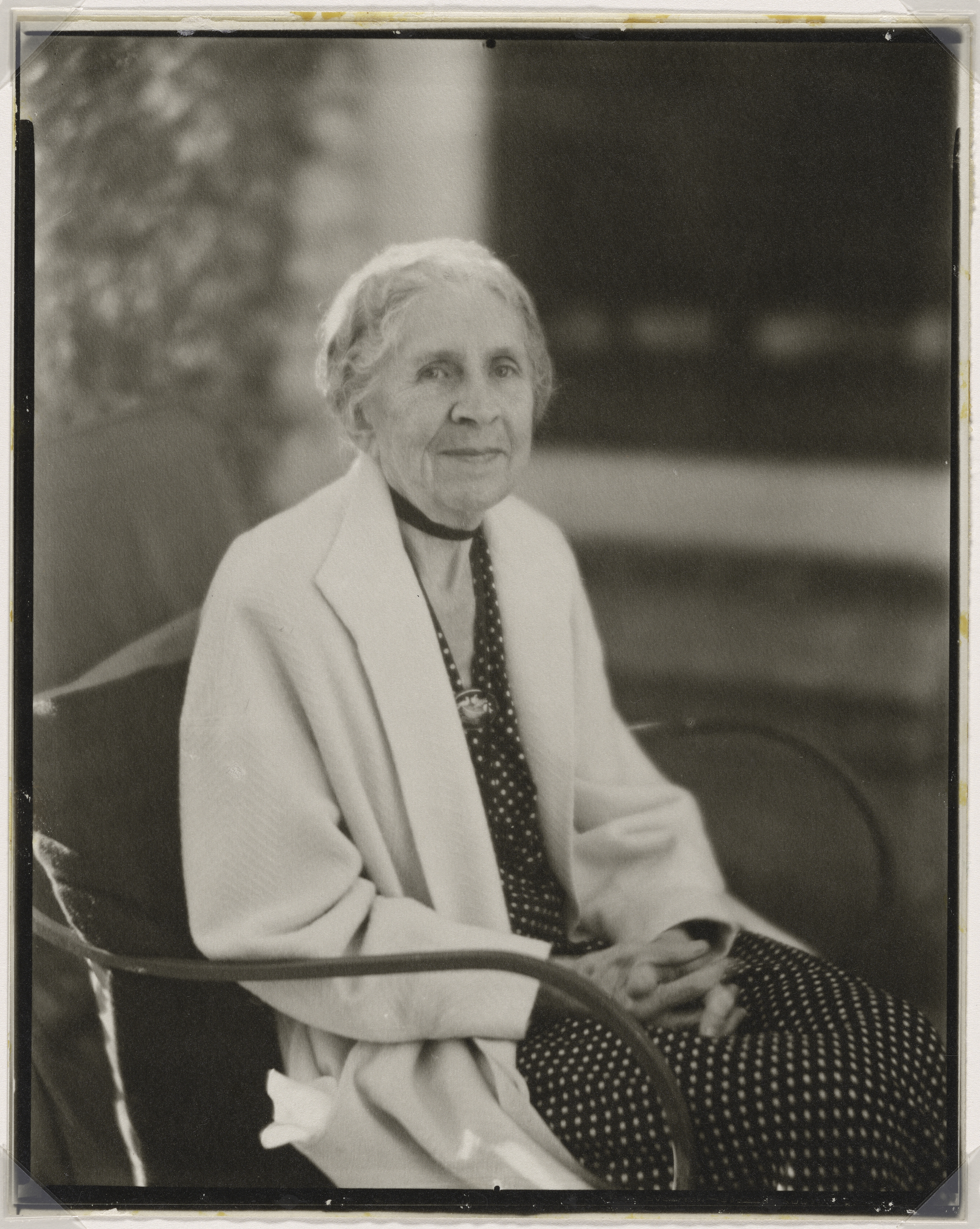
Journalist Ida Minerva Tarbell (1940)

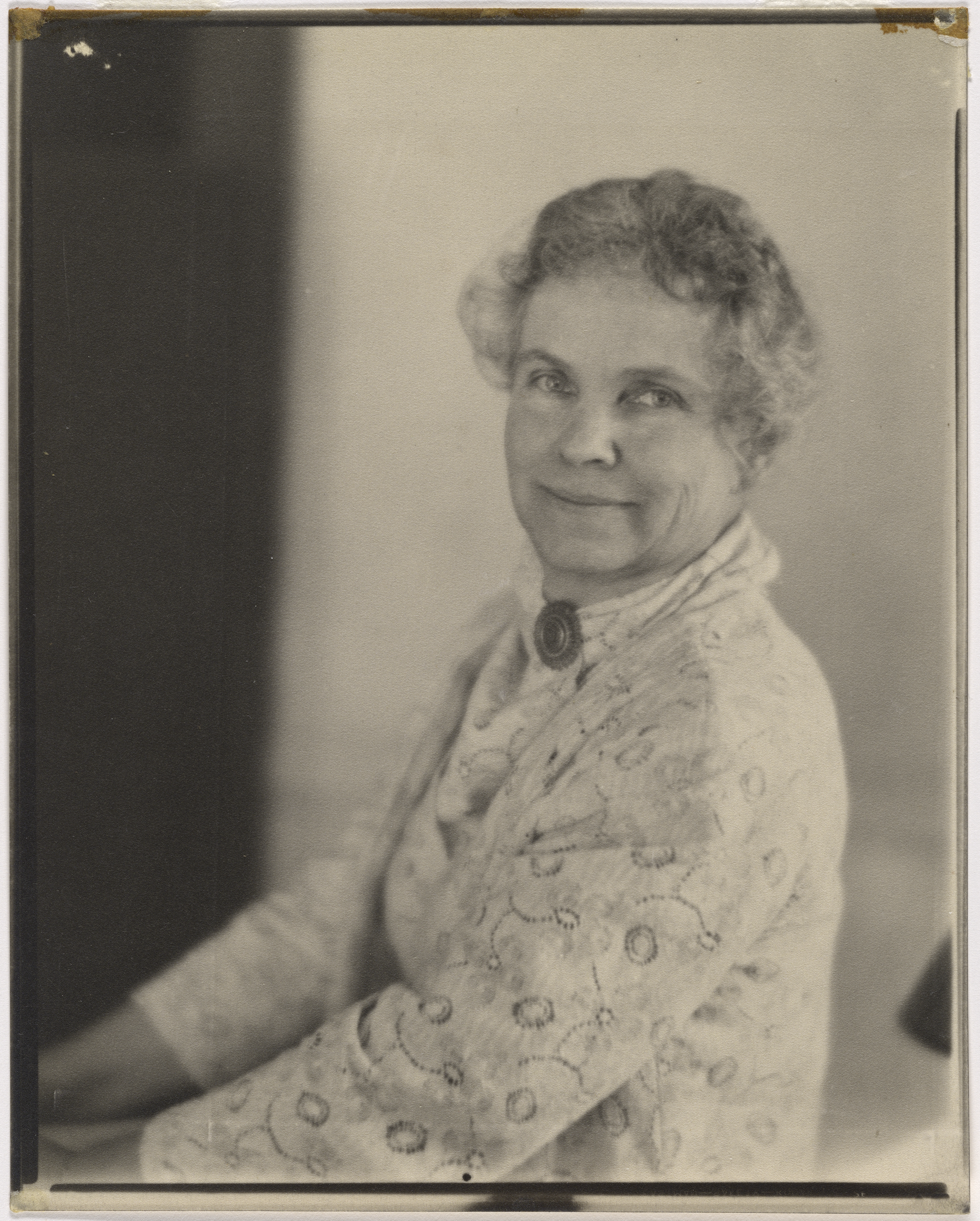
Children's writer Dorothy Canfield Fisher (1940)

Eleanor Roosevelt (1949)

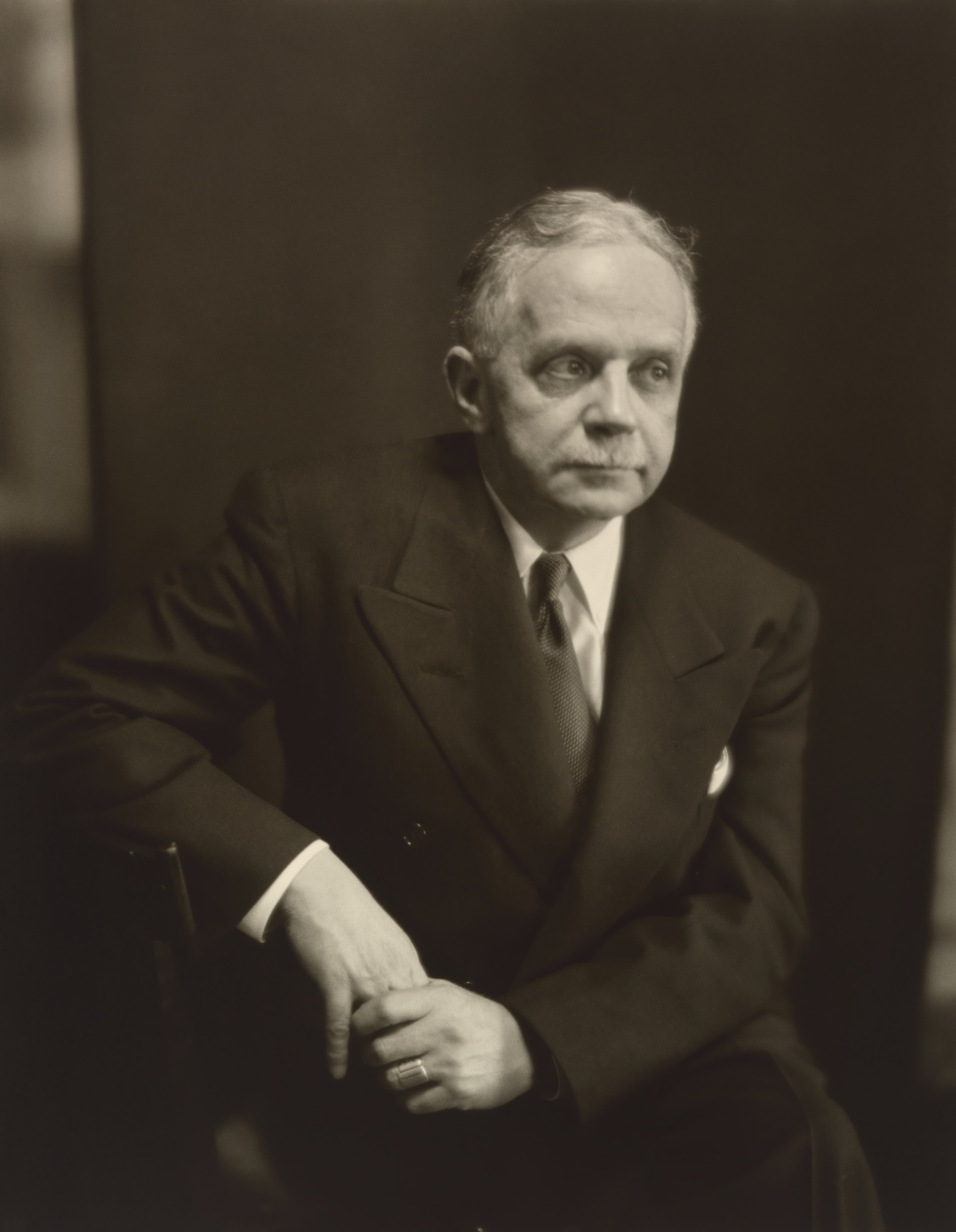
NAACP leader Walter Francis White (c. 1950)
