= Ogden Pleissner =

American painter

Ogden Minton Pleissner
- Born: 1905; Brooklyn, New York, United States
- Died: 1983 (aged 77–78); London, England
- Education: Art Students League
- Known for: painter

Ogden Minton Pleissner (1905–1983) was an American painter, specializing in landscapes and war art related to his service in World War II.

== Biography ==
Pleissner was born on April 29, 1905, in Brooklyn, New York. His father was very interested in the arts, especially music, and his mother was an accomplished violinist who had studied in Germany. When he was eleven a friend gave him a paint box filled with a wide array of colors. Growing up, Pleissner spent several summers in Wyoming where he sketched from life and developed a lifelong love of the outdoors, fishing, and the western landscape.

He attended the Art Students League of New York from 1922 to 1926, studying under Frank DuMond, and began teaching at the Pratt Institute soon after. Throughout the 1930s, Pleissner worked mainly in oils and became known for his Western landscapes, and images of the Maritimes and New England. The National Academy of Design awarded him the 1938 Second Hallgarten Prize for South Pass City (Wyoming Ghost Town).

He was commissioned as a captain in the United States Air Force at the start of World War II and stationed in the Aleutian Islands as a war artist. The inclement, damp weather demanded that Pleissner work in watercolors because they dried faster than oil paints. But Pleissner recalled that even watercolors were difficult to use in the wet climate: “ I would go out to do these watercolors and it was so damn wet nothing would dry... I used to put out a few big washes and then run into and out of the huts where there was a fire and dry it and go out again.”

In 1942, Pleissner accepted a commission from the United States Army as a war correspondent on inactive duty employed by Life magazine. After the war, Pleissner continued to travel to Europe and Wyoming, painting city scenes, landscapes, and sporting subjects.

Pleissner was also the director and trustee of the Tiffany Foundation (see The Louis Comfort Tiffany Foundation).

He died in 1983 in London, England, and was interred at Dellwood Cemetery in Manchester Village, Vermont.

In the years since his death, Pleissner's work has become quite popular among collectors of American sporting art and other genres of tangible Americana. Pleissner's works in both oil and watercolor are highly regarded, and his paintings consistently command a respectable price at auction. In 2010, Pleissner's 1938 oil, The Rapids, sold at auction for $345,000, a new record surpassing the previous mark of $220,000 set in 1996.

== Subject and Style ==
Pleissner was considered a Realist unimpeded by sentimentality. Pleissner’s contentment in his surroundings, interest in the world around him, and his satisfaction with his craft are evident in the masterful use of light and color that pervades his paintings.

Pleissner’s development as an artist visually unfolds on the gallery walls from his early years in Brooklyn, summers in Wyoming, visits to Nova Scotia and Connecticut, and beginnings as a sporting artist. His first canvases were of the Grand Teton Mountains in Wyoming and he became best known for his watercolors of New England scenes.

World War II brought about a major turning point in Pleissner's career. During WWII, his work was based on the Normandy breakthrough. Pleissner's post-war subjects became concerned with urban life in France, Italy and Spain. Pleissner had precision and clarity in the sense of light that comes through in many of his paintings. This, combined with his selection of only pictorial elements that contribute to an overall composition, characterizes his work.

== Quotes by Pleissner ==
'[I consider myself] a landscape painter, a painter of landscapes who also liked to hunt and fish'

“You can say that a picture has a sense of place, but in a painting, a landscape, to me it’s the mood conveyed that counts.”

“A friend of mine New York at the Salmagundi Club asked me why I didn’t paint watercolors. I said I don’t know how, and he said all you have to do is keep your board a little slanted so when you wash the color onto the paper it runs downhill. That I was my only lesson in watercolor.”

“It’s hard to say whether I have a favorite place to paint. There are many fascinating places in Europe and there’s so much right here in this country. . . Whether it’s Vermont, Normandy, or Paris, it doesn’t make that much difference, really.” -1983 interview

“Vermont is quite a different country. Out West we had the prairies and sagebrush and mountains and snow all summer. It is much bigger, dramatic country. This, I feel, is a softer country and much more friendly. I think that you can find most anything to paint here, all kinds of subjects, the dramatic and bucolic landscapes. Almost anything.”

I use color in my painting in different ways. Neutral colors and brilliant colors will create different moods. You can take the same motif, the same subject, at different times of the day or different times of the year. Some days it will appear to be very contrasty and brilliant, and the colors will be bright. Another day fog will roll over the scene or it will be early morning or later in the afternoon or evening. Then everything will meld together and you will not have this powerful effect of contrast, and a different, softer mood will prevail.”

“During the war I got interested in Europe. Afterward I went over and made a lot of sketches, especially in France, Italy, and England. More recently we’ve been to Portugal and Ireland.”

I went out very early and saw the morning sun coming up and the long shadows it cast across the great walk of the Tuileries. There were all these chairs that had been used the day before with just this one man sitting there reading his morning paper, and I thought it would make an interesting picture. There was a lovely effect of color and light so I painted it.” “I frequently make preliminary sketches for a painting, but lots of times I just start a large painting in my mind. Then I may refer to a number of sketches I have made at some point in the past; part of this one, part of that one, and part of another in the finished work. Sort of a composite, putting them all together to express a certain feeling you want on the canvas.”

== Where to find his work ==
The Pentagon owns his major collection of war art but the rest of his personal collection is now at Shelburne Museum.

Pleissner Gallery at Shelburne Museum features 40 of the Museum's 600 Pleissner works in a rotating exhibition. The gallery shows watercolors and oil paintings from all periods of Pleissner's career, including early renderings, Western landscapes, works from war-torn France and England, and sporting scenes. An adjoining room re-creates his Manchester, Vermont studio with his canvases, brushes, and personal memorabilia.

== See also ==
- Shelburne Museum
- Pleissner Gallery
- Art Students League of New York
- Pratt Institute
- Realism (arts)
- Fly Fishing
- The Louis Comfort Tiffany Foundation
