= Ann Elizabeth Isham =

Passenger aboard the Titanic (1862–1912)

- Born: January 25, 1862; Chicago, Illinois, United States
- Died: April 15, 1912 (aged 50); Atlantic Ocean

Ann Elizabeth Isham (January 25, 1862 – April 15, 1912) was a passenger aboard the RMS Titanic. She was one of four female first-class passengers to die when the ship sank. An unsubstantiated rumor states she died because she did not want to leave her Great Dane behind; a woman was reportedly sighted in the water a few days later with her arms frozen around a dog.

== Biography ==
Ann Elizabeth "Lizzy" Isham was born on January 25, 1862, in Chicago, Illinois, the first child of Edward Swift Isham, an American lawyer and politician from Vermont, and Frances "Fannie" Burch. Her father established a law firm with Robert Todd Lincoln, son of former US President Abraham Lincoln, called Isham, Lincoln & Beale in Chicago, Illinois.

Initially Isham lived in Chicago and was a member of the Friday Club and the Scribbler's Club. In 1903 she moved to Paris and lived with her sister, Frances Isham, who had married Harry Shelton.

Isham's brother, Edward Isham, lived in New York City and she was going back to the United States to spend the summer with him. She boarded the Titanic at Cherbourg Harbour on April 10, 1912.

Her cabin (C-49) was next to that of Colonel Archibald Gracie, although he did not remember ever seeing her. However, other passengers, such as Kornelia Andrews, her sister Mrs. John Hogeboom, and their niece Gretchen Longley, were acquainted with her, and even searched for her on the Carpathia after being rescued.

One story that has gained currency is almost certainly false. According to the unsubstantiated legend, a woman was said to have been in a lifeboat ready to lower when she was told that she would be unable to bring her Great Dane on board with her. She chose to get out of the lifeboat. A few days later, a passenger on a passing ship reported seeing a woman's body floating in the ocean and holding on to the body of a large dog. It was only in later years that Isham's name came to be associated with the story, as she was the only first class woman lost in the disaster whose whereabouts during the disaster were unknown.

There is no actual evidence for this story, however, as Isham did not even own a dog. She was one of four first class women who died in the disaster, and her body was never identified. A memorial to her was erected by her family in Vermont.
