= Laura Spelman Rockefeller =

American philanthropist, schoolteacher

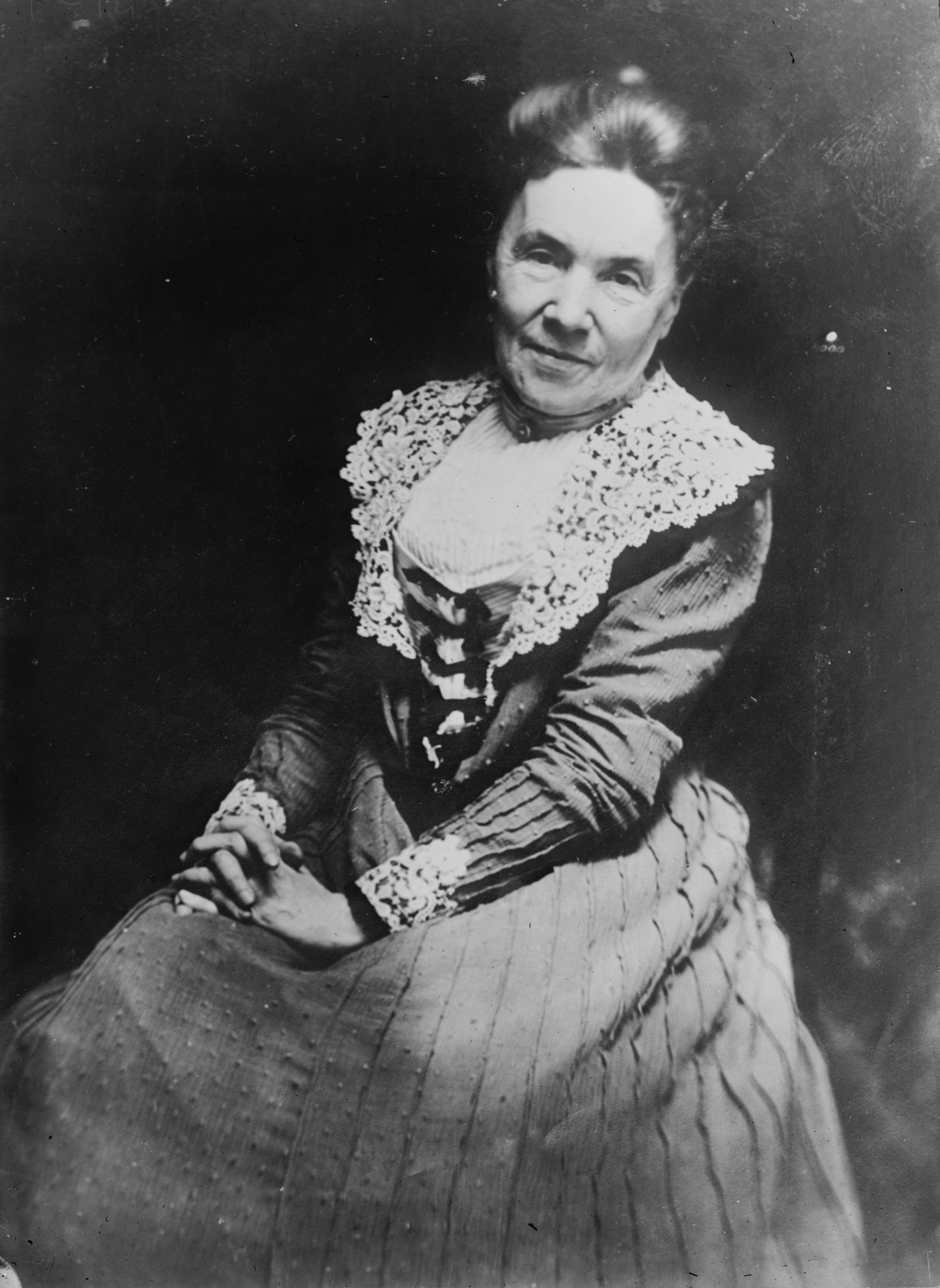
- Born: Laura Celestia Spelman; September 9, 1839; Wadsworth, Ohio, U.S.
- Died: March 12, 1915 (aged 75); Pocantico Hills, New York, U.S.
- Resting place: Lake View Cemetery; Cleveland, Ohio, U.S.
- Spouse: John Davison Rockefeller (m. 1864)
- Children: Elizabeth, Alice, Alta, Edith, and John Jr.
- Relatives: See Rockefeller family

Laura Celestia "Cettie" Spelman Rockefeller (September 9, 1839 – March 12, 1915) was an American abolitionist, philanthropist, school teacher, and prominent member of the Rockefeller family. Her husband was Standard Oil co-founder John D. Rockefeller. Spelman College in Atlanta and the Laura Spelman Rockefeller Memorial were named for her.

== Early life ==
Laura Celestia Spelman was born in Wadsworth, Ohio to Puritan descendant Harvey Buel Spelman (1811–1881) and Lucy Henry (1818–1897), Yankees who had moved to Ohio from Massachusetts. Laura's maternal step-grandmother, as well as her two aunts, were members of the Yale family, relatives of inventor Caroline Ardelia Yale.

Laura's father Harvey was an abolitionist who was active in the Congregationalist Church, the Underground Railroad, and in politics. The Spelmans eventually moved to Cleveland. Laura had an elder adopted sister, Lucy Maria "Lute" Spelman (c. 1837–1920). Laura was the valedictorian of her graduating class at Central High School in Cleveland at the age of 14.

== Personal life and career ==
In Cleveland, Lute and Laura Spelman met John Davison Rockefeller while attending accounting classes together. He was the eldest son of William Avery "Bill" Rockefeller (1810–1906) and Eliza Davison (1813–1889).

Laura Spelman later attended Oread Institute in Worcester, Massachusetts and planned to become a schoolteacher. After moving to Ohio to teach, she married John Rockefeller in 1864. After the wedding, Spelman remained active in the church (she joined Rockefeller's congregation, the Northern Baptists) and with her family. As the family business, Standard Oil, began to thrive, she further devoted her time to philanthropy and her children.

They were the parents of five children:

- Elizabeth ("Bessie") (August 23, 1866 – November 14, 1906),
- Alice (July 14, 1869 – August 20, 1870),
- Alta (April 12, 1871 – June 21, 1962),
- Edith (August 31, 1872 – August 25, 1932), and
- John Jr. (January 29, 1874 – May 11, 1960).

Throughout their lives, the Rockefeller family continued to donate ten percent of their income to charity, including substantial donations to Spelman College, founded to educate Black women. Laura Spelman Rockefeller died on March 12, 1915, at 75 of a heart attack, at the family estate Kykuit in Pocantico Hills, New York near the Hudson River.

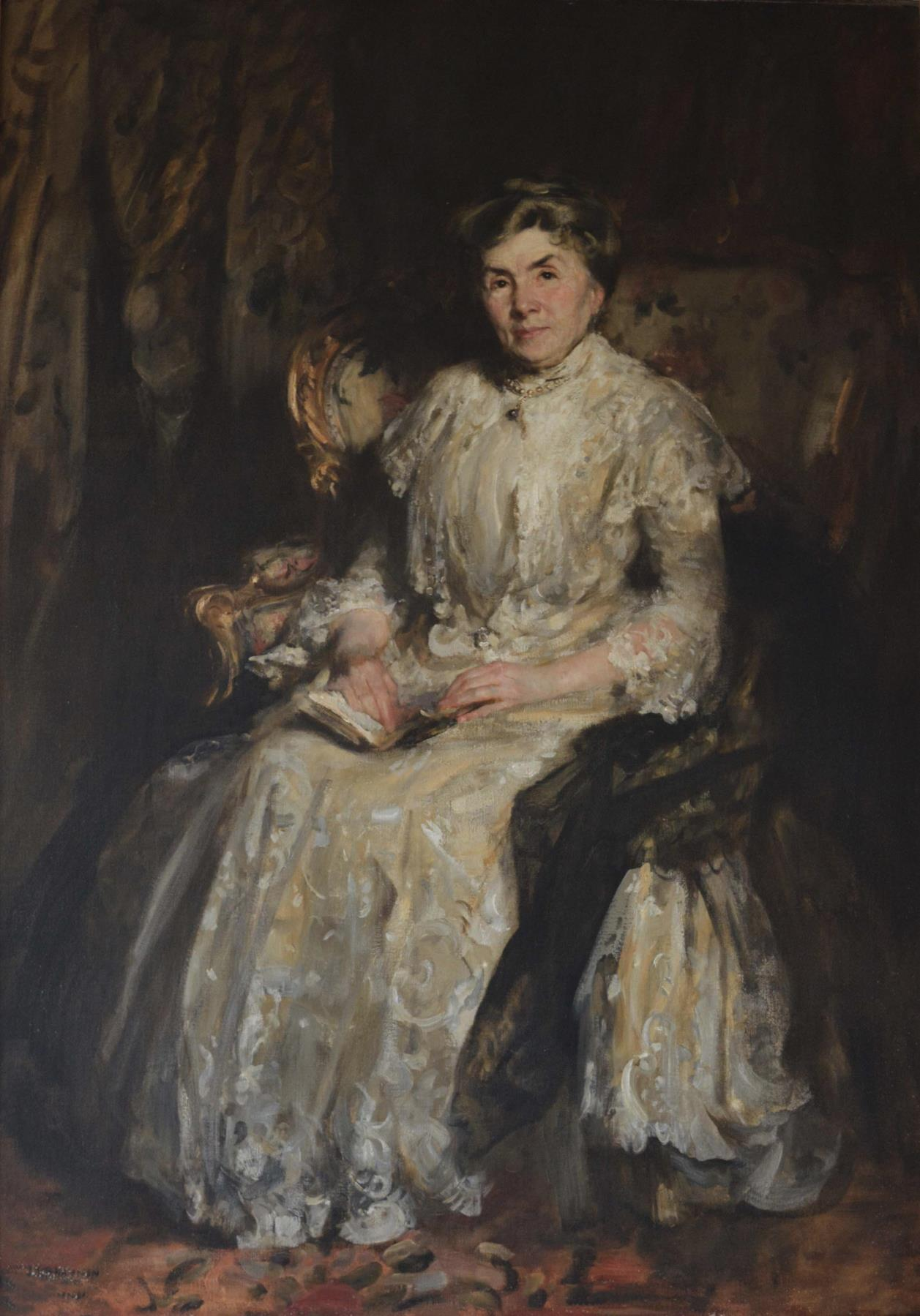
Portrait by James Jebusa Shannon, 1906

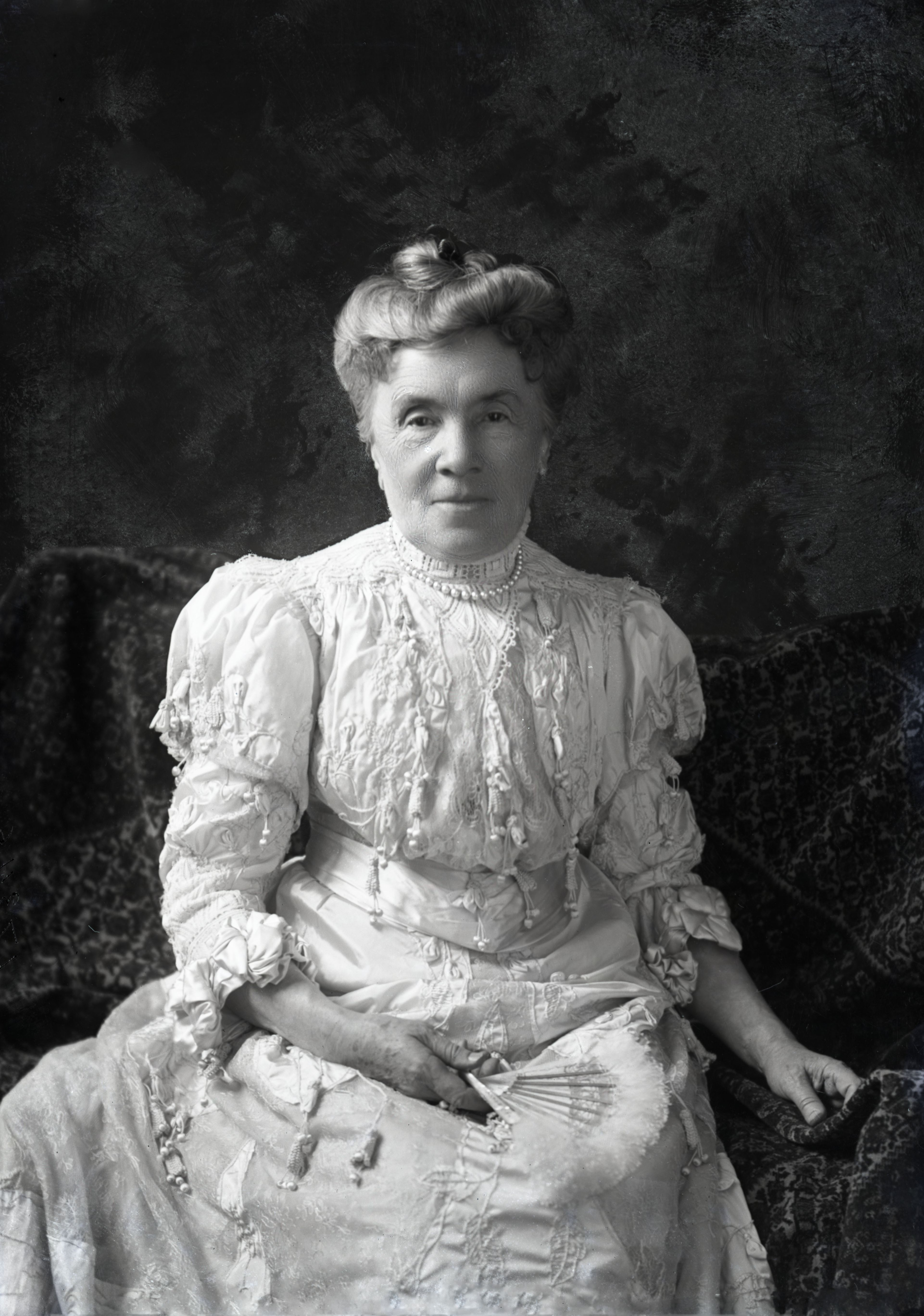
Portrait titled Mrs. John D. Rockefeller 1908

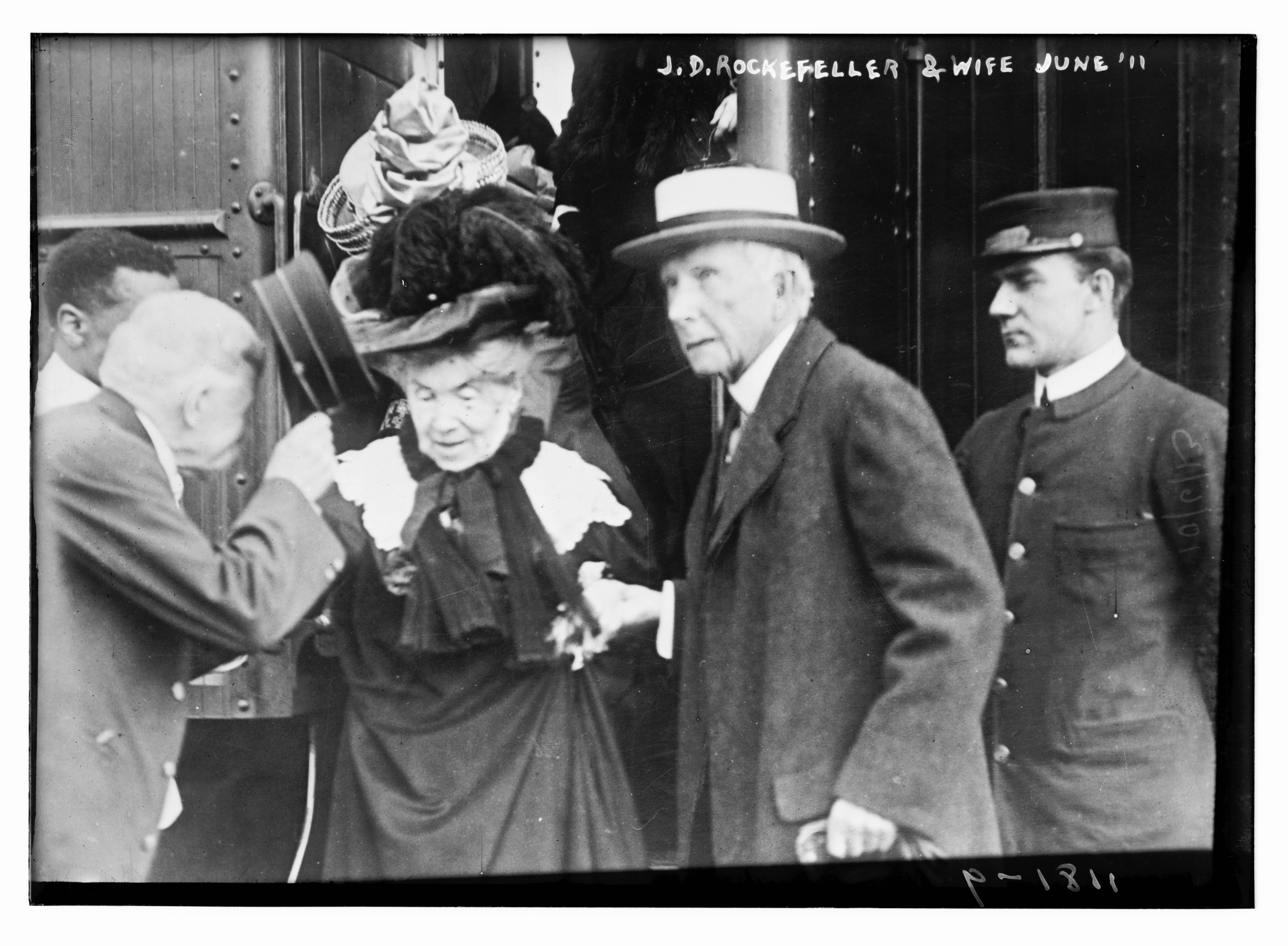
Laura Spelman Rockefeller and J.D. Rockefeller, 1911

== Legacy ==
John D. Rockefeller established the Laura Spelman Rockefeller Memorial Fund. He donated large amounts to the fund and charitable organizations then shifted his focus to giving to social sciences. Spelman College was named after Laura Spelman Rockefeller due to her significant financial contribution to the institution. Throughout her life, she was dedicated to social and educational causes, particularly for women and African Americans.

== See also ==
- Rockefeller Foundation
- Philanthropy
