= Edith Rockefeller McCormick =

American socialite (1872–1932)

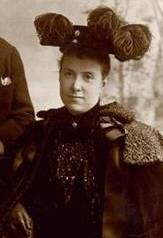
- Edith Rockefeller, 1895
- Born: Edith Rockefeller; August 31, 1872; Cleveland, Ohio, U.S.
- Died: August 25, 1932 (aged 59); Chicago, Illinois, U.S.
- Burial place: Graceland Cemetery
- Spouse: Harold Fowler McCormick (m. 1895; div. 1921)
- Children: 5
- Parent(s): John Davison Rockefeller; Laura Celestia Spelman
- Relatives: See Rockefeller family

Edith Rockefeller McCormick (August 31, 1872 – August 25, 1932) was an American socialite. McCormick's parents were Standard Oil co-founder John D. Rockefeller and Laura Spelman Rockefeller. She and her husband Harold Fowler McCormick were prominent in Chicago society, supporting many causes, including the city's first opera company. After being treated for depression by Carl Jung, she became a successful Jungian psycho-analyst herself. McCormick also studied astrology and reincarnation. She remained prominent after divorcing her husband and helped sponsor and organize several "Women's World Fairs" celebrating female achievement in the 1920s.

== Early life ==
Edith was born on August 31, 1872, at her parents' home in Cleveland, Ohio. She was the fourth daughter of schoolteacher Laura Celestia "Cettie" Spelman (1839–1915) and Standard Oil co-founder John Davison Rockefeller. Her brother was John Davison Rockefeller Jr. (1874–1960). Her three elder sisters were Elizabeth (Bessie) (1866–1906), Alice (1869–1870), and Alta (1871–1962).

Edith and her father had an often stormy relationship, where her extravagance would often conflict with his frugality. She was educated at home by private tutors and unlike other women of means at the time, did not attend finishing school.

== Personal life ==
On November 26, 1895, she married Harold Fowler McCormick from Chicago, a son of Nancy Fowler and Cyrus Hall McCormick, the inventor of the mechanical reaper. The married couple spent their first two years living in Council Bluffs, Iowa, where Harold managed a branch of his father's business. They later moved to Chicago. In 1912, they hired prominent architect Charles A. Platt to build a mansion on their large country estate, located directly on Lake Michigan in Lake Forest, Illinois, which they named Villa Turicum, and which had extensive architecturally landscaped gardens. Together, Harold and Edith were the parents of five children, three of whom survived to adulthood:

- John Rockefeller McCormick (1897–1901), who died young from scarlet fever.
- Editha McCormick (1903–1904), who also died young.
- Harold Fowler McCormick Jr. (1898–1973), who married Anne Urquhart Brown "Fifi" (née Potter) Stillman (1879–1969), who had previously been married to James A. Stillman, and was the daughter of James Brown Potter and Mary Cora Urquhart.
- Muriel McCormick (1903–1959), who married Elisha Dyer Hubbard (1878-1936), a nephew of Elisha Dyer Jr. and grandson of Elisha Dyer (both Rhode Island governors), in 1931.
- Mathilde McCormick (1905–1947), who married Wilheim Max Oser (1877–1942), a Swiss riding instructor, in April 1923.

A famous story about McCormick involves an evening in 1901 during a party. News arrived that Edith and Harold's elder son, John Rockefeller McCormick, had died of scarlet fever. It was rumored that when this was whispered to her at the dinner table, she proceeded to merely nod her head and allowed the party to continue without incident. A biographer of her father, however, makes it clear that this could not have been true: at the time of her son's death, Edith was with him at the family estate, Kykuit, at Pocantico Hills, New York. A year later, she and her husband established the John McCormick Institution of Infectious Diseases in Chicago, a source of funding for the researchers who later isolated the bacterium responsible for the disease.

=== Philanthropy and support of Jung ===
As wealthy socialites, with two family fortunes available, the McCormicks were prominent in Chicago social and cultural circles, donating large amounts of money and time to causes. Edith helped fund the juvenile probation program of Chicago's pioneering Juvenile Court system when it was revealed that, although legislation set up the system, there was no provision to fund the probation officers. Edith began support of the Art Institute in 1909 as a charter member and supported it with monetary contributions and loans from her extensive personal art collection. She and Harold, along with other wealthy patrons, founded the Grand Opera Company, the first in Chicago, in 1909.

In 1913, she travelled to Zürich to be treated for depression by Carl Gustav Jung and contributed generously to the Zürich Psychological Society. After extended analysis and intense study, Edith became a Jungian analyst, with a full-time practice of more than fifty patients. She would continue her practice after her return to America, attracting many socialite patients from around the United States. In order to disseminate Jung's ideas, Edith paid to have his writings translated into English. From February 1918 until October 1919, she provided James Joyce with a monthly benefaction. In 1919 McCormick donated land she had received from her father as a wedding gift to the Forest Preserve of Cook County, to be developed as a zoological garden, later to become Chicago's Brookfield Zoo. Edith later explained that her donation was motivated by a fascination with animal psychology. She returned to America in 1921 after an eight-year stay.

=== Divorce and later life ===
Edith and Harold were divorced in December 1921. He was given custody of their youngest daughter Mathilde so that she could marry Max Oser, a Swiss riding instructor. Mathilde and Max were married in London in April 1923. Meanwhile, Harold married Ganna Walska, a Polish opera singer in August 1922, becoming her fourth husband. Within days of Harold's remarriage, Edith announced plans to marry Edward Krenn, a 28-year-old Austrian architect. The plan fell through for undisclosed reasons in December 1922. In 1927, she was mentioned in a newspaper article about Chicago's wealthy unmarried, divorced, and widowed wealthy women. The article noted that she was "glad to be rid of the gay Harold McCormick, but hasn't succeeded in convincing her friends she will never marry again." Over the next few years, Edith and Harold frequently found themselves in court in lawsuits over the divorce agreement.

In February 1923, she received some minor press for claiming to be the reincarnation of the wife of King Tutankhamen, whose tomb had just been explored and was a popular topic. She was quoted as saying, "I married King Tutankhamen when I was only sixteen years old. I was his first wife. Only the other day, while glancing through an illustrated paper, I saw a picture of a chair removed from the King's chamber. Like a flash, I recognized that chair. I had sat in it many times." She followed up in Time magazine by stating "My interest in reincarnation is of many years' standing." She was also said to be interested in astrology and to celebrate Christmas on December 15.

=== Woman's World's Fair ===
In 1925, she and other wealthy Chicago women including Miss Helen M. Bennett, Mrs. John V. Farwell, Mrs. Silas Strawn, Mrs. John Alden Carpenter, Mrs. B.F. Langworthy, Mrs. Florence Fifer Bohrer, and Mrs. Medill McCormick sponsored an international exposition to celebrate the progress and achievements of American women – The first Woman's World's Fair, which was held at the American Exposition Palace on Lake Michigan in April 1925, and was held again each year in Chicago in April or May from 1926 to 1928. A local paper noted, of the first fair, that "One feature of the exhibit will be a collection of newspaper and magazine clippings, from various countries during the last 200 years emphasizing the storm of protest which greeted every suggestion for a freer social status for women." Newspaper articles mention organizing troubles that caused it to be cancelled in 1929. It was not held thereafter.

=== Death and burial ===
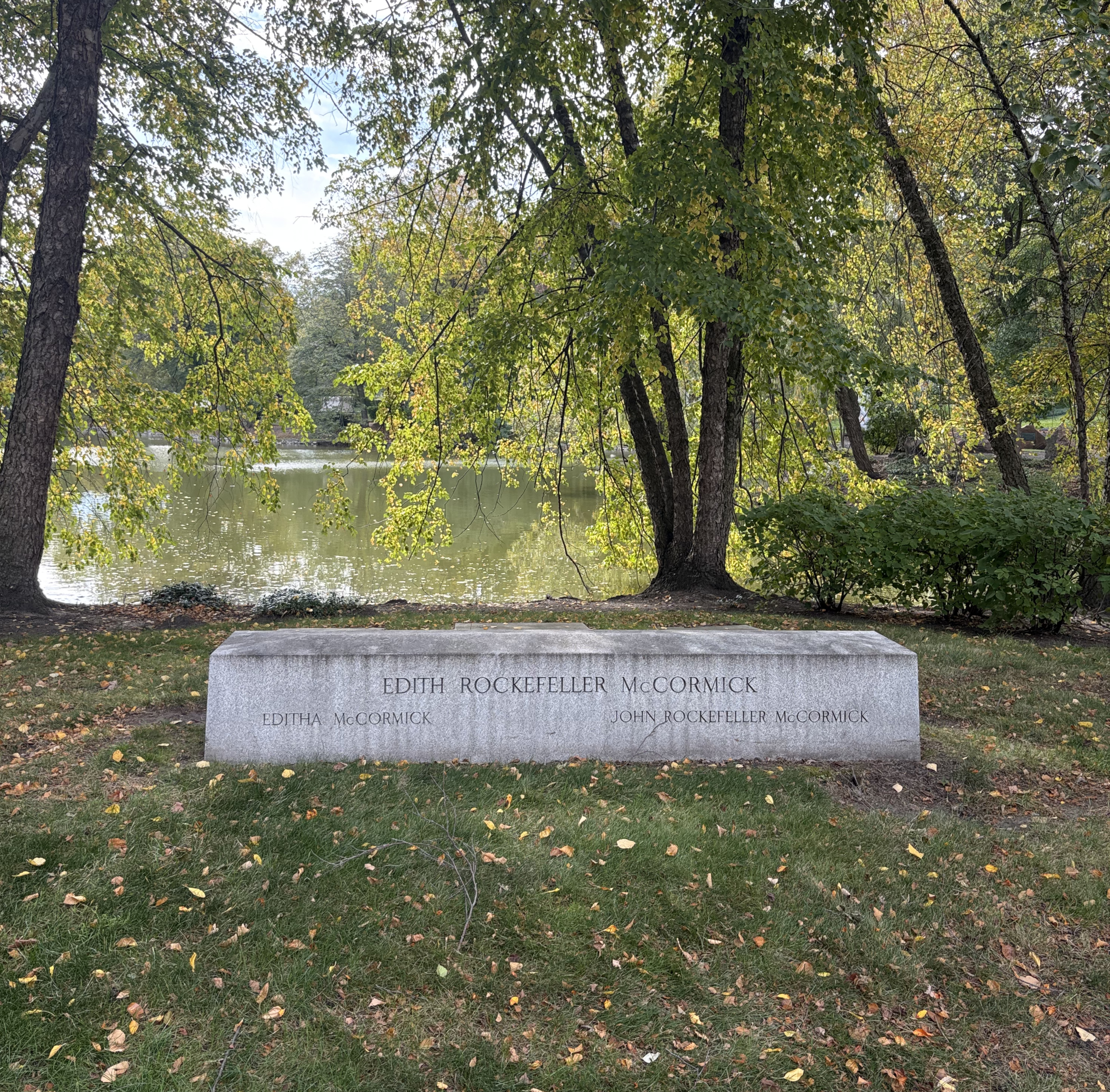
McCormick's grave at Graceland Cemetery

In 1930, Edith had a growth removed from her breast and died of cancer two years later on August 25, 1932, surrounded by her family. She and two of her children, John and Editha, are buried in Graceland Cemetery in Chicago. At the time of her death, her estate, through the Edith Rockefeller McCormick Trust set up by her father in 1923, consisted mostly of real estate and no longer held much Standard Oil stock.

== See also ==
- Rockefeller family
- John D. Rockefeller
