= Dellwood Cemetery =

Historic cemetery in Manchester Village, Vermont, US

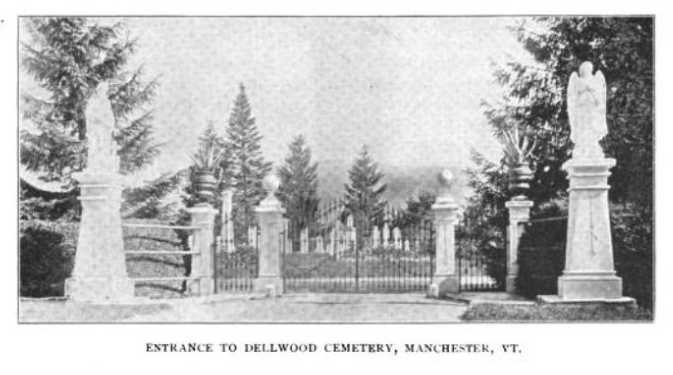
- Interactive map of Dellwood Cemetery

Details
- Established: 1865
- Location: 2950 Route 7A, Manchester Village, Vermont 05254
- Country: United States
- Coordinates: 43°09′08″N 73°04′28″W
- Size: 58 acres (23 ha)
- No. of graves: 2,000
- Website: https://dellwoodcemetery.org/
- Find a Grave: Dellwood Cemetery

Dellwood Cemetery is a historic rural cemetery established in 1865 in Manchester Village, Vermont.

== Description ==
The cemetery is located at 2950 Route 7A in Manchester Village, Vermont. It covers approximately 58 acres (23 ha) and contains approximately 2,000 interments. The entrance gate is flanked by two marble statues. One represents "Death" or "Mourning", and the other is the angel Gabriel, which represents a personification of the "Resurrection".

One section of the cemetery contains the tombstones from the old town cemetery established in 1784. The tombstones from the old cemetery were moved to clear the lot for construction of the courthouse in 1822, but the bodies were not re-interred.

Dellwood Cemetery is still an active burial location, however only 5 to 6 burials occur each year. The cemetery was listed on the National Register of Historic Places in 2026.

== History ==
The cemetery was established in 1865 through an act of the Vermont legislature. It was built on thirteen acres (5.3 ha) purchased through donations made by two previous residents of Manchester Village, Illinois State Representative Mark Skinner and Judge Helmus Wells. The cemetery was laid out in the rural cemetery design popular in the 19th century by the landscape architect Burton A. Thomas.

In 1873, Skinner donated additional funds for the creation of the cemetery gates and in 1875, the two marble statues at the gate were added.

In July 1926, Abraham Lincoln's son, Robert Todd Lincoln, died at Hildene, the family home in Manchester Center, Vermont. His body was stored in the receiving vault at Dellwood Cemetery until March 1928 when arrangements were made to inter his remains at Arlington National Cemetery.

== Notable burials ==
- Edward Swift Isham (1836–1902), politician
- Pierpoint Isham (1802–1872), attorney and judge
- Ahiman Louis Miner (1804–1886), politician
- Loveland Munson (1843–1921), politician and judge
- Ogden Pleissner (1905–1983), painter
- Alta Rockefeller Prentice (1871–1962), philanthropist
- Benjamin S. Roberts (1810–1875), Union Army general
- Leonard Sargeant (1793–1880), lieutenant-governor of Vermont
- Clara Sipprell (1885–1975), photographer
- Mark Skinner (1813–1887), politician
- Richard Skinner (1778–1833), governor of Vermont
- Walter J. Travis (1862–1927), amateur golfer
