= Charles A. Bane =

American lawyer and civil rights activist

Charles Arthur Bane (May 1, 1913 – April 5, 1998) was an American lawyer and civil rights activist who was a former federal judicial nominee to the United States Court of Appeals for the Seventh Circuit and who also was the first president of the United Way's Illinois chapter.

== Early life and education ==
Born in Springfield, Illinois and the son of a poor coal miner, Bane graduated at the top of his Springfield High School class. Bane earned a bachelor's degree (Phi Beta Kappa) from the University of Chicago in 1935 and was elected a Rhodes Scholar. At Oxford, he befriended fellow Rhodes Scholar and future novelist Robert Penn Warren. Bane later served on The Rhodes Scholar Selection Committee. He earned a bachelor's degree in jurisprudence from the University of Oxford in 1937 and he earned a law degree from Harvard Law School in 1938.

== Professional career ==
Bane worked as an attorney for the law firm of Sullivan & Cromwell from 1938 until 1942 and from 1946 until 1949. From 1942 until 1943, Bane was an attorney with the U.S. Office of Lend-Lease Administration, and he was on active duty with the United States Navy as an intelligence officer with OSS, stationed in London, from July 1943 until February 1946. OSS personnel were instrumental in convincing the enemy that D-day forces would land at a beach-head other than Normandy.

From 1949 until 1952, Bane was a partner with the law firm of Mitchell, Conway and Bane in Chicago. In the early 1950s, Bane also worked as the lawyer representing the Chicago City Council's Crime Investigating Committee, which focused on organized crime. He quickly concluded that the crime syndicate had corrupted Chicago's Police Department. He later resigned from his post when the Chicago City Council refused to force police officers to disclose sources of income. As a result of his crime-fighting career, he was asked by prominent Chicago Republicans to run for mayor. He declined.

Bane became a partner in the Chicago law firm of Isham Lincoln and Beale in 1953. The firm was founded by the surviving son of Abraham Lincoln, Robert Todd Lincoln. The younger Lincoln used a letter of recommendation from Thomas Edison to obtain the firm's first client, Commonwealth Edison. Bane served on the Advisory Board of The Lincoln Legal Papers Project, a mammoth effort that resulted in the collection of more than 5,000 documents relating to Abraham Lincoln's legal practice.

Bane also played a major role in the findings of the National Advisory Committee On Civil Disorder, or Kerner Commission, established by President Lyndon Johnson in the wake of 1967 national race riots, and chaired by Illinois governor Otto Kerner Jr. The Commission was established by Johnson to reportedly find conspiracies aimed at violence within Black communities. Bane chaired the concurrent Citizen's Committee To Study Police Relations (in Chicago). The Committee called 47 witnesses which produced 1,900 pages of transcript. When the Kerner Report, issued February 28, 1968, declared famously that "our nation is moving towards two societies, one Black, one White-separate and unequal", and that race riots could be traced to inadequate employment opportunities and substandard housing, Johnson was enraged.

Bane also served as Editor of the Chicago Bar Record, Chairman of the American Bar Association Journal, and authored "The Electrical Equipment Conspiracies:The Treble Damage Actions" (1973), a groundbreaking legal text. He also served as President of the Chicago Council On Foreign Relations. Under President Jimmy Carter, he served two years as Co-Chairman of the Lawyers' Committee for Civil Rights Under Law. Following retirement to Florida, he was Visiting Professor Of Law at the University of Miami School Of Law and planned to begin a legal biography of Abraham Lincoln.

Each year the Charles A. Bane Humanitarian Award is presented to a volunteer by the United Way Of Illinois.

== Failed nomination to the Seventh Circuit ==
On May 28, 1969, President Richard Nixon nominated Bane to a seat on the United States Court of Appeals for the Seventh Circuit to replace Elmer Jacob Schnackenberg, who had died in September 1968. Immediately, Bane's nomination ran into trouble for three reasons. First, Bane had litigation pending on his 1963 tax return because of his attempt to deduct $16,000 for business and entertainment expenses. Deputy Attorney General Richard Kleindienst had asked Bane to attempt a settlement with the Internal Revenue Service, and although Bane had tried unsuccessfully to reach a settlement. With the IRS declining to back down from its position, Bane told the White House he would prefer to litigate the case. In addition, Bane had been alleged to have been anti-semitic because he allowed a Jewish family to be rejected for an apartment by the board of his cooperative apartment building at 209 E. Lake Shore Drive in Chicago. Finally, Bane, in a letter he sent to the president on June 30, 1969 requesting that his nomination be withdrawn, cited "pressing commitments" in his law firm and a growing need for him to remain there.

On October 22, 1969, Nixon formally withdrew Bane's nomination.

On September 22, 1970, Nixon nominated John Paul Stevens to the seat to which he had nominated Bane. Stevens was confirmed by the United States Senate on October 8, 1970, and Stevens eventually went on to a seat on the Supreme Court of the United States.

Bane was the only federal appeals-court nominee of Nixon's entire presidency who was never confirmed. (Two of Nixon's Supreme Court nominees, Clement Haynsworth and G. Harrold Carswell, both were rejected outright by the United States Senate in votes.)

== Death ==
Bane died in West Palm Beach, Florida on April 5, 1998.
