= 1821 Vermont gubernatorial election =

- September 4, 1821
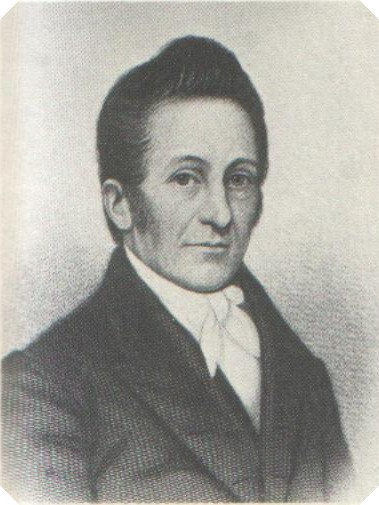
Nominee	Richard Skinner
Party	Democratic-Republican
Popular vote	12,434
Percentage	98.71%
- County results Skinner: 90–100%
Governor before election
Richard Skinner
Democratic-Republican
Elected Governor
Richard Skinner
Democratic-Republican

The 1821 Vermont gubernatorial election took place on September 4, 1821. It resulted in the election of Richard Skinner to a one-year term as governor.

The Vermont General Assembly met in Montpelier on October 11. The Vermont House of Representatives appointed a committee to review the votes of the freemen of Vermont for governor, lieutenant governor, treasurer, and members of the governor's council. With the Federalist Party defunct, Democratic-Republican Richard Skinner was the only major candidate. The committee determined that Skinner had easily won a second one-year term against only scattering opposition.

In the election for lieutenant governor, the committee determined that Democratic-Republican William Cahoon, who was unopposed, had won election to a second one-year term. The vote totals were recorded as 11,817 (98.8%) for Cahoon, with 146 (1.2%) scattering.

Benjamin Swan was unopposed for election to a one-year term as treasurer, his twenty-second. Though nominally a Federalist, Swan was usually endorsed by the Democratic-Republicans and often ran unopposed. Vote totals for the 1821 election were recorded as 10,637 (99.6%) for Swan and 41 (0.04%) scattering.

In the race for governor, the results of the popular vote were reported as follows.

== Results ==
1821 Vermont gubernatorial election
Party	Candidate	Votes	%
Democratic-Republican	Richard Skinner (incumbent)	12,434	98.71
Write-in		163	1.29
Total votes		12,597	100.0
