= Joseph Dresser Wickham =

American minister

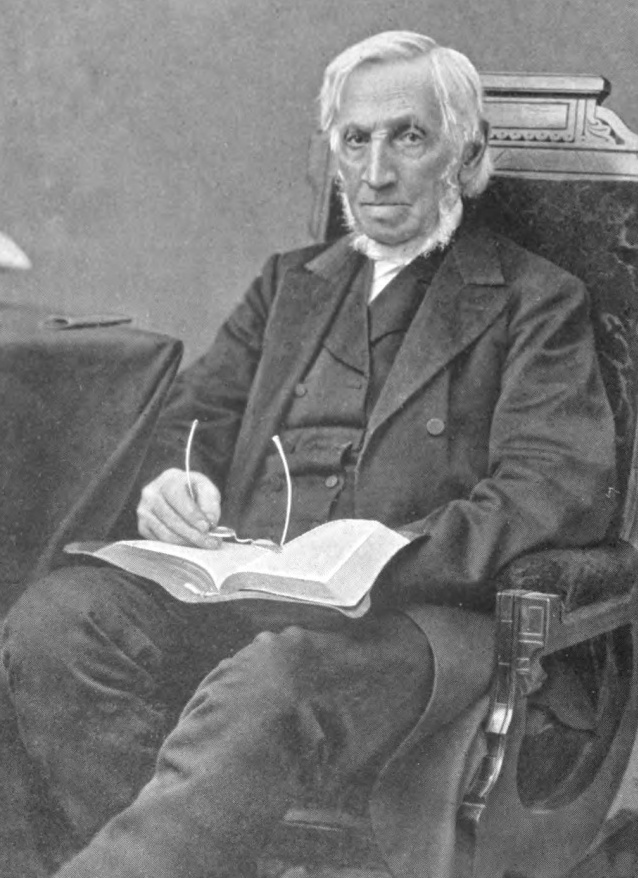
Joseph Dresser Wickham

Joseph Dresser Wickham (April 4, 1797 – May 12, 1891) was an American minister.

Wickham was born in Thompson, Connecticut on April 4, 1797, the eldest son of Daniel H. and Mary (Dresser) Wickham, who in 1799 removed to New York City. He graduated from Yale College in 1815. For the last five years of his life, he was the last survivor of the class of 1815, and for three years was the oldest living graduate of Yale.

For the first year after leaving college he served as amanuensis to Yale President Timothy Dwight, and during the following year was Rector of the Hopkins Grammar School in New Haven. From 1818 to 1820 he held a tutorship in Yale College, at the same time pursuing theological studies under Professors Fitch and Goodrich.

He began his ministerial labors in 1821 as a missionary on Long Island, and then spent some time in central New York in the service of the Presbyterian Education Society. Having been invited to the charge of a Congregational Church in Oxford, Chenango County, he began his labors there in January, 1823, and on July 31, at the dedication of a new house of worship, he was ordained to the ministry.

He removed in the spring of 1825 to Westchester County, New York, where he remained for a somewhat longer period in charge of the united Presbyterian churches of New Rochelle and West Farms. In 1828 he became one of the proprietors of the Washington Institute, a prominent boarding-school for boys in New York City, where he remained (ultimately in sole charge) until 1834. In November 1834 he was installed pastor of the recently organized Presbyterian Church at Matteawan in the town of Fishkill, N. Y. At the end of two years, being solicited to renew his service in connection with the Education Society, he spent a laborious year among the churches of Northern and Western New York.

He removed in December, 1837, to Manchester, Vt., to take charge of the Burr Seminary, with which he remained connected for twenty-five years, except for three years (1853–56), in the first of which he was Treasurer of Middlebury College and Acting Professor of Latin and Greek, while for the two following years he was connected with the Collegiate Institute in Poughkeepsie, N. Y. In 1856 he returned after great urgency to the charge of Burr Seminary, but resigned his position in 1862, though continuing to serve the institution as President of its Board of Trustees.

He lived in retirement in Manchester until his death, retaining remarkable physical and mental vigor to the last. He was chosen a member of the Board of Trustees of Middlebury College in 1840, and continued in that position throughout his life. That corporation conferred upon him the degree of D.D. in 1861.

Dr. Wickham was married, on May 26, 1823, to Julia A., only daughter of Jonathan E. Porter, of New Haven and a niece of President Dwight. She died on December 23, 1830. He was again married, on December 28, 1831, to Amy, daughter of Col. Moses Porter, of Hadley, Mass., and a cousin of his first wife, who died October 29, 1832. He was married for the third time, on October 12, 1834, to Elizabeth C., eldest daughter of the Rev. Samuel Merwin, who survived him. Of his two children, a daughter by his first wife died in infancy, and a daughter by his second wife survived him.

He died in Manchester on May 12, 1891, at age 94.

== Attribution ==
This article incorporates public domain material from the 1891 Yale Obituary Record.
