= Pierpoint Isham =

American judge (1802–1872)

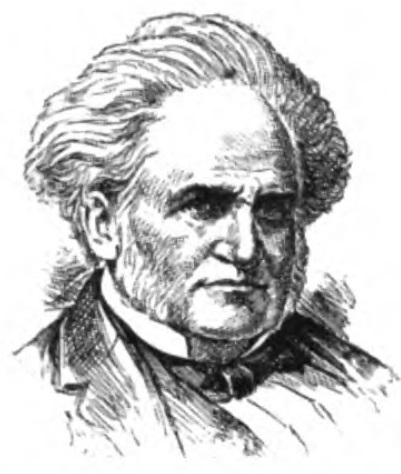
- From Volume VII (1897) of The National Cyclopaedia of American Biography

Associate Justice of the Vermont Supreme Court
- In office 1851–1856
- Preceded by: Daniel Kellogg
- Succeeded by: Luke P. Poland

Vermont Bank Commissioner
- In office 1848–1850
- Preceded by: Carlos Coolidge
- Succeeded by: George C. West

Personal details
- Born: August 5, 1802; Manchester, Vermont
- Died: May 8, 1872 (aged 69); Piermont, New York
- Resting place: Dellwood Cemetery, Manchester, Vermont
- Political party: Whig
- Spouse: Semantha Swift (m. 1831)
- Children: 3, including Edward Swift Isham
- Occupation: Attorney

Pierpoint Isham (sometimes spelled Pierpont, Pierrepont, or Pierrepoint; August 5, 1802 – May 8, 1872) was a Vermont attorney and judge who served as an Associate Justice of the Vermont Supreme Court from 1851 to 1856.

== Biography ==
Isham was born in Manchester, Vermont on August 5, 1802, the son of Dr. Ezra Isham and Nancy (Pierrepont) Isham. He was raised and educated in Manchester, and at age 19 began the study of law with Richard Skinner. He was admitted to the bar in 1823, and established a practice in Bennington and Pownal. In 1831, he received the honorary degree of Master of Arts from Middlebury College. In the 1820s and 1830s, Isham was active in the Vermont Militia and served as inspector of the 2nd Division, which was headquartered in Manchester.

In 1848, the Vermont General Assembly appointed Isham state bank commissioner, succeeding Carlos Coolidge, and he served until 1850. In 1851, Isham was appointed an associate justice of the Vermont Supreme Court. He served until 1856, when he declined appointment to another term.

Isham moved to Piermont, New York in 1860. He continued to practice law until his death in Piermont on May 8, 1872. Isham was buried at Dellwood Cemetery in Manchester, Vermont.

== Family ==
In 1831, Isham married Semantha Swift, the daughter of Dr. Noadiah Swift and Jennet Henderson of Bennington. They were the parents of three children:

- Edward Swift Isham (1836-1902), an attorney in Chicago, who practiced in partnership with Robert Todd Lincoln, and served in the Illinois House of Representatives
- Mary Adeline Isham Prentice (1839-1913), the wife of Army Major Sartell Prentice
- Henry Pierrepont Isham (1842-1897), a Chicago real estate broker and banker

== Sources ==
=== Books ===
- Aldrich, Lewis Cass (1889). History of Bennington County, Vt. Syracuse, NY: D. Mason & Co.

=== Newspapers ===
- "Death notice, Pierrepont Isham" (PDF). New York Times. New York, NY. May 10, 1872.
- "Vermont News: Bennington County". Green Mountain Freeman. Montpelier, VT. May 22, 1872.

=== Internet ===
- Harrington, S. P. (October 16, 2016). "Edward Swift Isham". Dellwood Cemetery. Manchester, VT: Dellwood Cemetery Association.

Political offices
Preceded by Milo Lyman Bennett	Justice of the Vermont Supreme Court; 1851–1856	Succeeded by Luke P. Poland
