= Edward Swift Isham =

American politician (1836–1902)

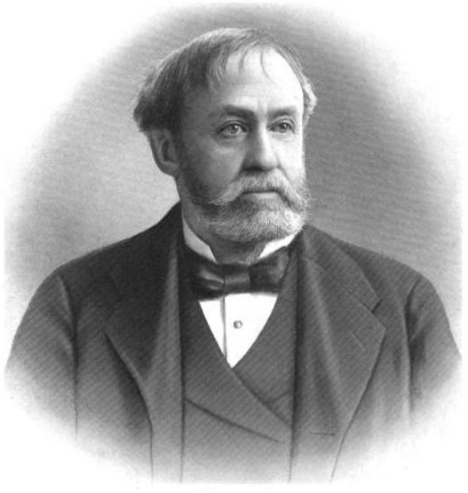

Member of the Illinois House of Representatives from the 60th district
- In office January 2, 1865 – January 7, 1867
- Preceded by: Melville Fuller
- Succeeded by: Moses W. Leavitt

Personal details
- Born: January 15, 1836 Bennington, Vermont
- Died: February 16, 1902 (aged 66) New York, New York
- Party: Republican
- Spouse: Frances Burch (m. 1861; died 1894)
- Children: 4, including Ann
- Parent(s): Semantha Swift Isham; Pierpoint Isham
- Education: Lawrence Academy; Williams College; Harvard Law School
- Profession: Lawyer

Edward Swift Isham (January 15, 1836 – February 16, 1902) was an American lawyer and politician from Vermont. The son of a justice of the Vermont Supreme Court, Isham attended Williams College and the Harvard School of Law before he was admitted to the bar in 1858. He headed west, establishing a practice in Chicago, Illinois, in 1859. The practice eventually became Isham Lincoln & Beale. Isham also served one term in the Illinois House of Representatives.

== Early life ==
Edward Swift Isham was born in Bennington, Vermont on January 15, 1836. He was the eldest son of Semantha (née Swift) Isham (1808–1896) and Pierpoint Isham (1802–1872), later a justice of the Vermont Supreme Court. Among his siblings was Mary Adeline Isham, the wife of Sartell Prentice (their son Ezra married Alta Rockefeller), and Henry Pierpont Isham, a Chicago real estate broker and banker.

His paternal grandparents were Dr. Ezra Isham and Nancy (née Pierpont) Isham, (Note: Edward Swift Isham's paternal grandfather, Dr. Ezra Isham (1773–1835), was the brother of Samuel Isham (1752–1827), both sons of John Isham II (1721–1802), who was born at Barnstable, Massachusetts and moved to Colchester, Connecticut. Samuel Isham was the grandfather of leather merchant William Bradley Isham (1827–1909), who was the father of historian Charles Bradford Isham (1853–1919) (husband of Mamie Lincoln, Robert Todd Lincoln's daughter) and Samuel Isham, a prominent artist).) and his maternal grandparents were Dr. Noadiah Swift and Jennet (née Henderson) Swift. His maternal grandmother Nancy was the great-granddaughter of Rev. James Pierpont, the founder of Yale University.

He was raised in northwestern Massachusetts. At the age of sixteen, he had to drop out of school due to illness. After two years' recovery in South Carolina, Isham returned to Groton, Massachusetts, where he studied at Lawrence Academy. In 1853, he was accepted at Williams College and studied there for four years. The school awarded him a master's degree in 1860.

== Career ==
Isham studied law in his father's office and then attended the Harvard School of Law. He was admitted to the bar in Rutland, Vermont, in 1858.

He decided to practice in the west, ostensibly to St. Paul, Minnesota or St. Louis, Missouri. However, he decided to settle instead in Chicago, Illinois reportedly because he was "favorably impressed with the advantages of all kinds which the city seemed to afford him." He practiced in the office of Hoyne, Miller & Lewis and then formed a partnership in 1859, known as Stark & Isham with James L. Stark. Isham quickly rose to prominence among Chicago lawyers. In 1864, Isham was elected to the Illinois House of Representatives as a Republican, where he served a two-year term and was a member of the judiciary committee.

After his term expired, Isham spent two years in Europe, then returned to his law practice. In February 1872, Isham admitted Robert Todd Lincoln, the son of Abraham Lincoln, as a junior partner. In 1886, William G. Beale was also admitted as a partner, and henceforth the partnership was known as Isham Lincoln & Beale. The firm retained this name until it dissolved in 1988. Isham's most notable cases include the arrangement of the Newberry Library endowment and the 1876 Chicago mayoral election controversy. He received an LL.D. from Williams College in 1893.

== Personal life ==
In 1861, Isham was married to Frances "Fannie" Burch (1838–1894), the daughter of the Hon. Thomas Burch and his wife Eliza Burch of Little Falls, New York. Fannies first cousin, Mary Weld Burch, was the wife of Alexandre Ribot, the Prime Minister of France. They had two sons and two daughters, including:

- Ann Elizabeth Isham (1862–1912), who died during the sinking of the RMS Titanic, one of only four upper-class women to do so.
- Pierrepont Isham (1865–1906), who graduated from West Point in 1887 and served in the 7th Cavalry Regiment and later became a partner in the law firm. He married Lois Kellogg in 1893.
- Edward Swift Isham Jr. (1868–1927), who graduated from Yale and married Laura Miller, and was the father of three.
- Frances Isham (1872–1970), who married Henry Tweedy Shelton (1862–1950), a Yale Law School graduate.

Isham was a charter member of the Chicago Club and drafted its incorporation papers in 1869.

He died suddenly of heart disease on February 16, 1902, while at the Waldorf-Astoria Hotel in New York, New York. After a funeral at the Brick Presbyterian Church in New York, he was buried at Dellwood Cemetery in Manchester, Vermont.
