= Manchester, Vermont =

Town in Vermont, United States

- Town
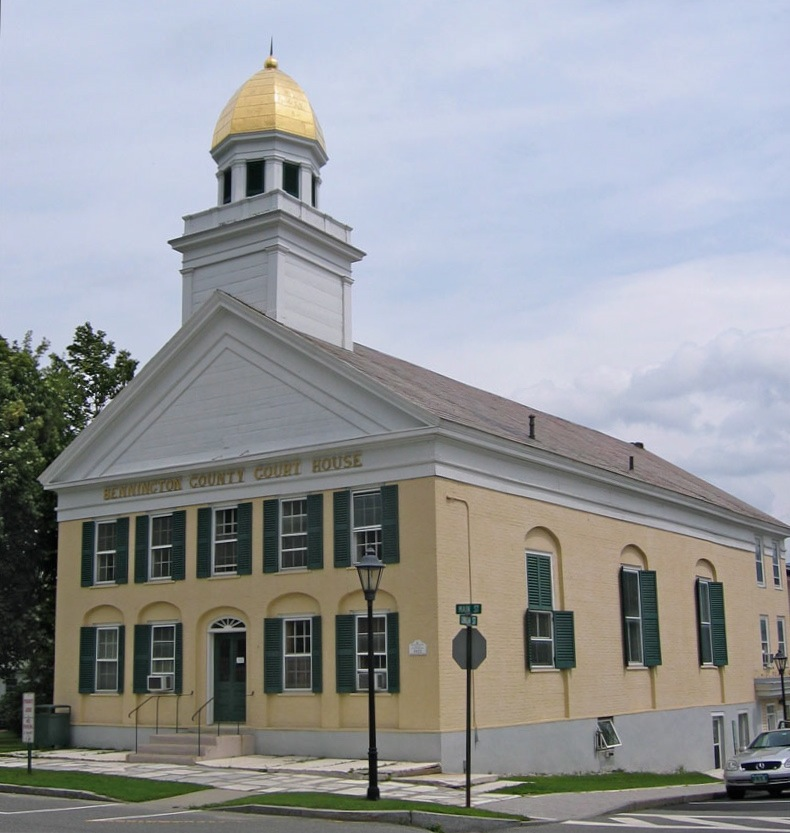
- Bennington County Courthouse in Manchester Village

- Logo
- Motto: "So Close. So Vermont."
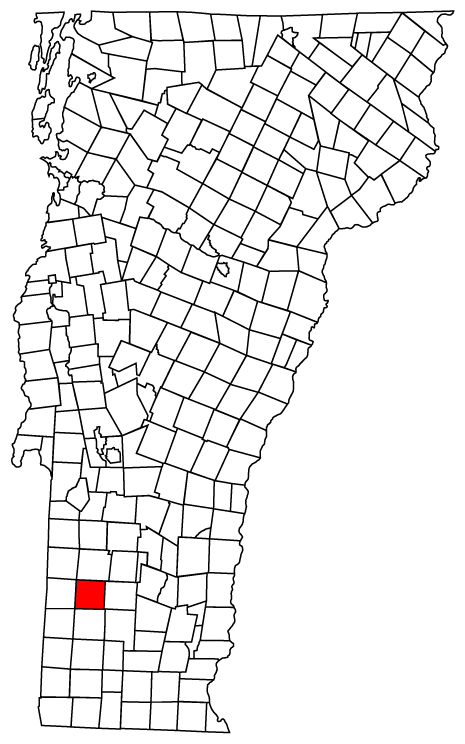
- Manchester, Vermont
- Coordinates: 43°08′32″N 73°05′08″W
- Country: United States
- State: Vermont
- County: Bennington
- Named for: Robert Montagu, 3rd Duke of Manchester
- Communities: Manchester; Manchester Center; Manchester Depot; Barnumville; Richville

Area
  - Total: 42.2 sq mi (109.4 km^{2})
  - Land: 42.1 sq mi (109.1 km^{2})
  - Water: 0.12 sq mi (0.3 km^{2})
- Elevation: 824 ft (251 m)

Population (2020)
  - Total: 4,484
  - Density: 106/sq mi (41.1/km^{2})
- Time zone: UTC−5 (Eastern (EST))
  - Summer (DST): UTC−4 (EDT)
- ZIP Codes: 05254; 05255 (Manchester Center)
- Area code: 802
- FIPS code: 50-42850
- GNIS feature ID: 1462142
- Website: manchester-vt.gov

Manchester is a town in, and one of two shire towns (county seats) of, Bennington County, Vermont, United States. The population was 4,484 at the 2020 census.

Manchester Village (an incorporated village) and Manchester Center are settlement centers within the town.

== History ==
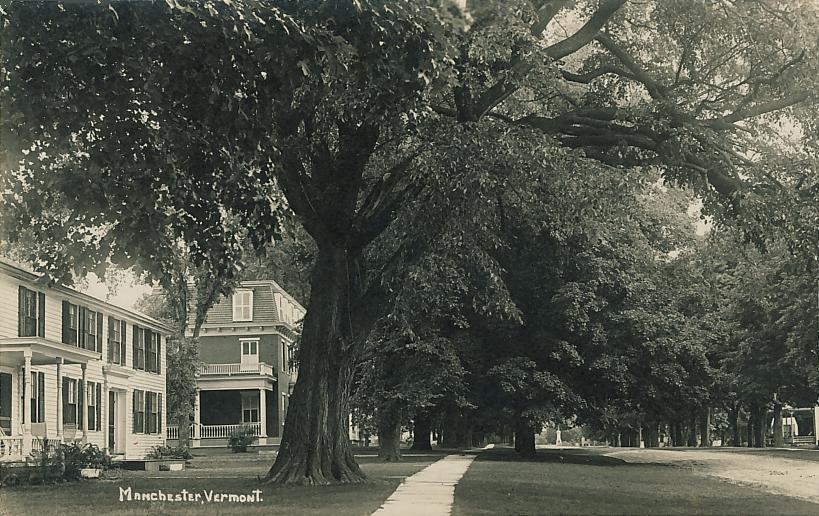
View of Manchester in 1913

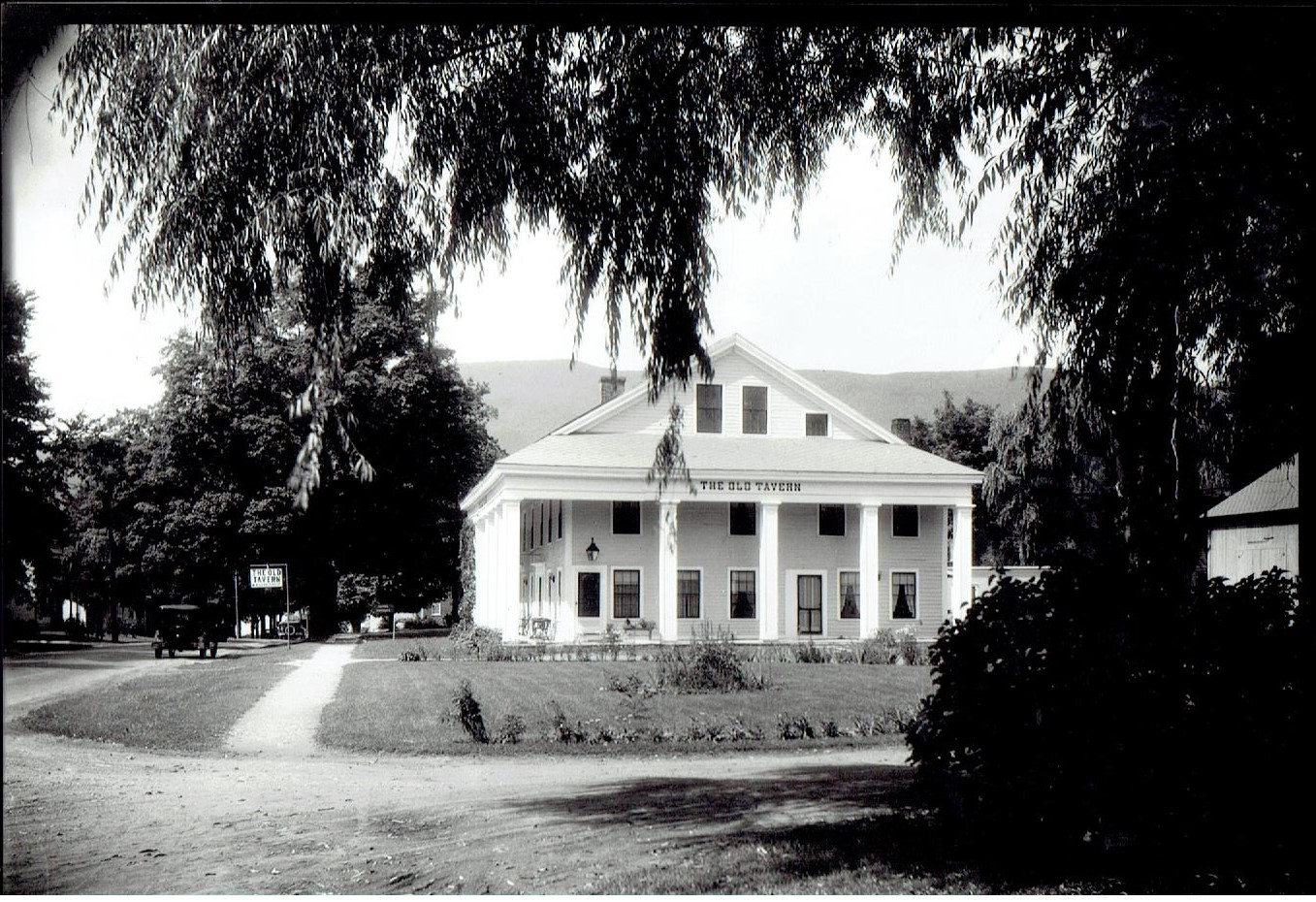
c. 1920s at Ye Olde Tavern

The town was one of several chartered in 1761 by Benning Wentworth, colonial governor of New Hampshire. It was his custom to name new towns after prominent English aristocrats of the day, hoping they might adopt a patronly interest in their namesakes. Wentworth named Manchester for Robert Montagu, 3rd Duke of Manchester. First settled in 1764, the town was laid out in 1784. The land was better suited for grazing than tillage, so by 1839 about 6,000 sheep roamed the pastures and hillsides.

Other industries came to include iron mines, marble quarries and mills, and lumber companies. The arrival of the railroad from industrialized centers like New York City brought tourists, drawn by Manchester's historic architecture and beautiful setting among mountains. Following the Civil War, the town developed into an affluent resort area, which it remains today.

Between 1812 and 1819, Manchester was made famous by the Boorn–Colvin case, called "America's first wrongful conviction murder case", the subject of several books and still studied today.

Orvis is a family-owned retail and mail-order business specializing in high-end fly fishing, hunting and sporting goods. Founded in Manchester in 1856 by Charles F. Orvis to sell fishing tackle, it is the oldest mail-order retailer in the United States.

Jake Burton Carpenter, founder of Burton Snowboards, perfected snowboard design in his garage in Manchester. The company operated out of Manchester until 1992, when it relocated to Burlington. Nearby Stratton Mountain was among the first ski resorts to allow snowboarding.

The town has three distinct state-recognized historic districts—the Depot district located on Highland Avenue and Elm Street, Bonnet Street, just north of Main Street, and Main Street itself.

== Geography ==
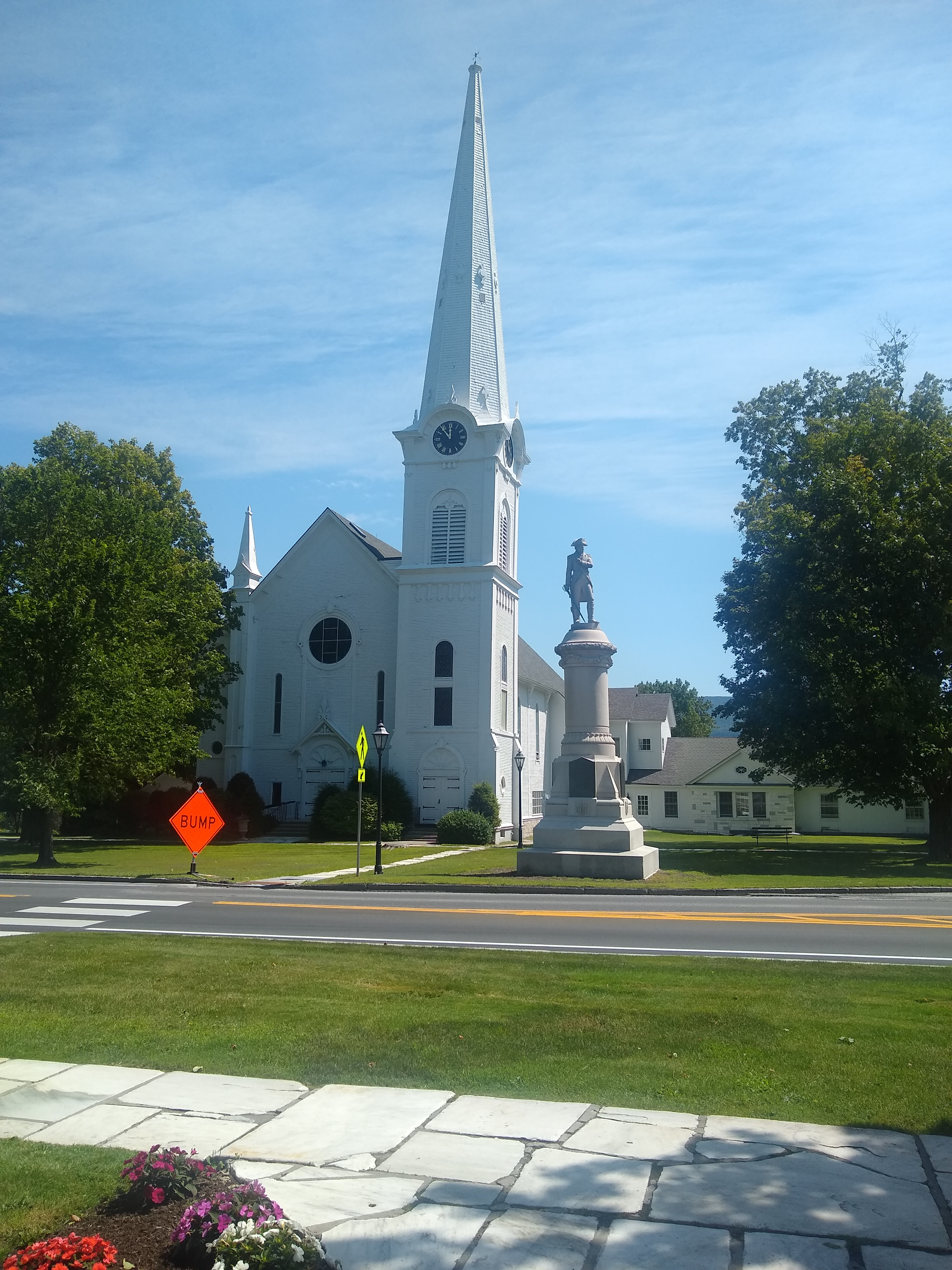
The Congregational Church in Manchester Village, Vermont

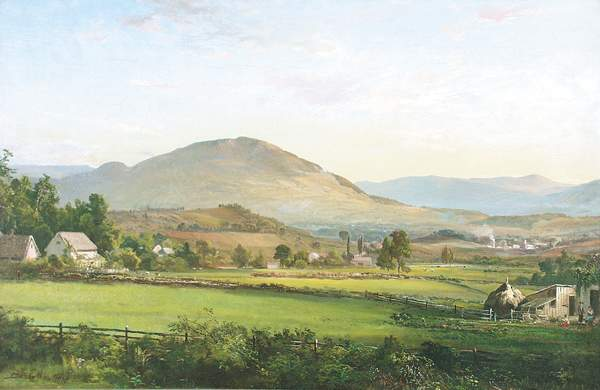
View of Manchester, Vermont by DeWitt Clinton Boutelle, 1870

Manchester is located in north-central Bennington County, lying between the Green Mountains to the east and the Taconic Range to the west. Equinox Mountain, the highest summit in the Taconics, with an elevation of 3,850 feet (1,170 m), is in the western part of the town. Manchester is drained by the Batten Kill, Lye Brook, Munson Brook, Bromley Brook, and Bourn Brook. The Lye Brook Falls Hiking Trail, which leads to one of the highest waterfalls in Vermont, is a popular local attraction.

According to the U.S. Census Bureau, the town has a total area of 42.2 square miles (109.4 km^{2}), of which 42.1 square miles (109.1 km^{2}) is land and 0.1 square miles (0.3 km^{2}), or 0.29%, is water.

== Demographics ==
Historical population
Census	Pop.	Note	%±
1790	1,276		—
1800	1,397		9.5%
1810	1,502		7.5%
1820	1,508		0.4%
1830	1,525		1.1%
1840	1,599		4.9%
1850	1,782		11.4%
1860	1,688		−5.3%
1870	1,897		12.4%
1880	1,928		1.6%
1890	1,907		−1.1%
1900	1,955		2.5%
1910	2,044		4.6%
1920	2,057		0.6%
1930	2,004		−2.6%
1940	2,139		6.7%
1950	2,425		13.4%
1960	2,470		1.9%
1970	2,919		18.2%
1980	3,261		11.7%
1990	3,622		11.1%
2000	4,180		15.4%
2010	4,391		5.0%
2020	4,484		2.1%
U.S. Decennial Census

As of the census of 2000, there were 4,180 people, 1,819 households, and 1,156 families residing in the town. The population density was 99.0 people per square mile (38.2 people/km^{2}). There were 2,456 housing units at an average density of 58.2 units per square mile (22.5 units/km^{2}). The racial makeup of the town was 97.87% White, 0.38% Black or African American, 0.17% Native American, 0.31% Asian, 0.43% from other races, and 0.84% from two or more races. Hispanic or Latino of any race were 1.75% of the population.

There were 1,819 households, out of which 28.5% had children under the age of 18 living with them, 51.5% were married couples who were living together, 9.5% had a female householder with no husband present, and 36.4% were non-families. Of all households 30.5% were made up of individuals, and 14.0% had someone living alone who was 65 years of age or older. The average household size was 2.26 and the average family size was 2.81.

The population distribution by age for Manchester was 23.1% under the age of 18, 4.0% from 18 to 24, 25.0% from 25 to 44, 28.8% from 45 to 64, and 19.1% who were 65 years of age or older. The median age was 44 years. For every 100 females, there were 87.9 males. For every 100 females age 18 and over, there were 84.3 males.

The median income for a household in the town was $47,196, and the median income for a family was $59,191. Males had a median income of $36,453 versus $26,017 for females. The per capita income for the town was $30,499. About 2.2% of families and 4.6% of the population were below the poverty line, including 1.9% of those under age 18 and 6.5% of those age 65 or over.

== Transportation ==
Manchester is crossed by four highways, including one Super-2 freeway. They are:

- U.S. Route 7 (Exit 4 serves the town)
- Historic VT Route 7A
- Vermont Route 30
- Vermont Route 11

Green Mountain Community Network's Orange Line bus and MVRTD "The Bus" Manchester-Rutland Connector serve the town with public transit commuter connections to Bennington and Rutland, respectively. The closest major airport is Albany International Airport in New York, although three daily round trip flights from Rutland to Boston are available via Cape Air from Rutland – Southern Vermont Regional Airport. Greyhound, the national intercity bus system, also serves Manchester through Premier Coach's Vermont Translines with an intercity bus connection between Burlington, Vermont and Albany, New York.

=== Rail ===
Manchester has several Amtrak passenger train connections within a one-hour drive.

- Rutland station to the north, the closest, served by the Ethan Allen Express
- Bellows Falls station to the east, served by the Vermonter
- Fort Edward station to the west, served by the Adirondack and Ethan Allen Express

VTrans and NYSDOT have shown interest in restoring passenger train service to Manchester on a new Amtrak route between Albany and Burlington via Rutland, also linking up nearby Mechanicville, New York and North Bennington, Vermont. The new train would share much of its route with the Ethan Allen Express, likely running beyond Albany to New York City. As of 2021, the idea is listed simply as a "potential initiative" in the Vermont Rail Plan.

== Notable attractions ==
Hildene, the summer home of Robert Todd Lincoln and Mary Lincoln, is a mansion in the Georgian Revival style completed in 1905 that is located southwest of Manchester Center. Robert Lincoln, the only child of President Abraham Lincoln and Mary Todd Lincoln to survive into adulthood, served as Secretary of War to Presidents Garfield and Arthur, was appointed Minister (Ambassador) to Great Britain during the administration of President Benjamin Harrison, and later became general counsel and then president of the Pullman Company. The Hildene house and surrounding grounds are open to the public.

Also located in Manchester, at the base of Mount Equinox, is the Southern Vermont Arts Center (SVAC). In addition to hosting art exhibitions from its permanent collections and of visiting collections in its gallery facilities, SVAC conducts educational programs and provides facilities for performances and events in the arts. The permanent collection at SVAC includes the work of such regional artists as Ogden Pleissner, Jay Hall Conaway, Reginald Marsh, Guy Pene du Bois, Lorenzo Hatch, Luigi Lucioni, Arthur Gibbs Burton, and Robert Strong Woodward.

== Media ==
Like the rest of Bennington County, Manchester lies in the Albany–Schenectady–Troy television and radio media market.

Manchester is home to alternative rock radio station WEQX's studios. Their broadcast tower is on the summit of Equinox Mountain, from which their callsign derives. The tower's location allows the station's signal to reach the northern and eastern Capital Region of New York's radio market area, while also being able to reach the remainder of southern Vermont, western Massachusetts, and southwestern New Hampshire.

WVNK 91.1 FM, a VPR partner station, is also licensed to Manchester.

Print news is carried in the Manchester Journal and Bennington Banner.

== Notable people ==
- Elfriede Abbe, sculptor
- Charles Augustus Aiken, clergyman; president of Union College; professor at Princeton University
- Joseph Sweetman Ames, physicist; president of Johns Hopkins University
- Frank C. Archibald, Vermont Attorney General
- Edmund Bennett, judge and educator
- Myra Bradwell, first American woman to become an attorney
- James M. Clarke, US congressman
- Sarah Norcliffe Cleghorn, poet and social activist
- Jeremiah French, soldier, judge and political figure in Upper Canada
- Jonathan Goldsmith, actor ("The Most Interesting Man in the World" from Dos Equis advertising)
- John Irving, novelist and Academy Award-winning screenwriter
- Edward Swift Isham, Chicago attorney and law partner of Robert Todd Lincoln
- Pierpoint Isham, Justice of the Vermont Supreme Court
- Robert Todd Lincoln, first son of Abraham Lincoln
- Richard Wall Lyman, president of Stanford University; president of the Rockefeller Foundation
- Ahiman Louis Miner, US congressman
- Elizabeth Page, author
- Benjamin S. Roberts, Civil War general
- Daniel Roberts, attorney and president of the Vermont Bar Association
- Robert Roberts, mayor of Burlington, Vermont
- The Samples, alternative rock band
- Clara Sipprell, photographer
- Richard Skinner, jurist, US congressman, Governor of Vermont
- Joseph Dresser Wickham, headmaster of Burr and Burton Academy
- Treat Williams, movie and television actor

== See also ==
- Manchester, Dorset and Granville Railroad
