= Brash =

Brash may refer to:

- Brash (surname), including a list of people with the name
- Brash, a term applied to some accumulations of fragments:
  - the loose rubble found in the lowest layer of the soil
  - an accumulation of drift ice fragments
- Water brash, hypersalivation secondary to gastroesophageal reflux disease
- Brash Entertainment, a video game company
- Thomas Brash Morison (1868-1945), Scottish politician and judge
- Olof the Brash

== See also ==
- Brasch
- Brasher (disambiguation)
- Brash Island in Antarctica
