= Braasch =

Braasch is a surname. Notable people with the surname include:

- Antje Braasch (born 1938), German middle-distance runner
- Gary Braasch (1944–2016), American photographer and writer
- Karsten Braasch (born 1967), German tennis player

== See also ==
- Braasch Biotech, a company that specializes in the development of biopharmaceutical vaccine products
- Brasch
- Baasch
