= Brasher =

Brasher can refer to:

- Brasher (surname), people and fictional characters with the name
- Brasher, New York, a town
- Brasher, a UK boot manufacturer owned by the Pentland Group

== See also ==
- Brasher Doubloon, a rare, privately minted American coin
- The Brasher Doubloon, a 1947 film
- Brash (disambiguation)
- Brasch, a surname
