= Bradsher =

Bradsher is a surname. Notable people with the surname include:

- Arthur Bradsher (1883–1951), American college baseball player and businessman
- Keith Bradsher, American reporter

== See also ==
- Bradsher cycloaddition, a form of the Diels–Alder reaction
- Brasher (surname)
