= Fonville Winans =

Fonville Winans, ca. 1930

Theodore Fonville Winans (August 22, 1911 – September 13, 1992) was an American photographer whose black-and-white images documented south Louisiana people and places. He established a successful practice as a wedding and portrait photographer, but is best known for his images of south Louisiana's rugged outdoors, and its fishermen and swamp dwellers.

== Early Cajun Images ==
Fonville was born on in Mexico, Missouri and spent part of his childhood in Fort Worth, Texas, where, as a senior in high school, he purchased his first camera, a Kodak 3A model. Armed with this camera, Fonville shortly won $15 in a photography contest, which stirred his interest in pursuing photography as a career.

In 1928, Fonville moved to Louisiana to work in construction, and it was during this time that he fell in love with the state. Fonville began photographing the state's southern swamps and grassy coastal wetlands, as well as the people who inhabited them, most notably the Cajuns. "Louisiana was my Africa, my South America," he recalled.

Fonville's timing was fortuitous, for as Ben Forkner noted, "Thanks to an absence of roads and bridges, and to a largely inward-turned and jealous identity, the Cajun settlements and outposts that Fonville found were irregular islands of a predominantly French-speaking culture that continued to resist the tidal floods of 'progress' and the 20th century. . . . [W]hen Fonville appeared with his boat and camera the more remote strongholds of Cajun society could still give the impression of a private country at home in the midst of millennial swamp forests and endless river prairies, and only half-open to the modern world."

Anne Price has observed that Fonville's photographs from this period were a "human, cheerful record of a people who were self-sufficient enough to make their own way with dignity despite the times, . . . Fishermen, hunters, moss gatherers and other wetlands residents are seen at work and at play. His landscapes and seascapes are haunting and enduring, and his always accurate eye captures the essence of time and place."

Fonville himself recalled of these images, "I didn’t take any of these pictures deliberately. I just took them for fun. None was on assignment. I wasn’t even a freelancer. I just took my camera and got pictures when I saw something interesting."

== Later career ==
In 1934 he became a student at Louisiana State University, where he majored in journalism and performed in the school's brass choir. He often photographed on LSU campus and had images published in the Reveille student newspaper and in the school's yearbook, Gumbo.

Around 1940 Fonville opened his own photography studio in Baton Rouge, Louisiana. "I had a side porch I covered with tar paper," he recalled, "and made into a darkroom. I used my bathroom for plumbing fixtures. I used the dining room to make portraits. I photographed several important people, and word got around pretty fast."

Fonville's wife did classic make-up for the subjects. Fonville photographed LSU student Joanne Woodward. He advised female subjects to wear a white, high necked, top, which he found more flattering. Fonville typically offered his subjects a drink to help them relax.

Eventually he established a solid reputation as a wedding and studio portrait photographer, capturing images of local beauties and state politicians. Yet Fonville became best known for his images of south Louisiana's rugged outdoors, as well as its fishermen and swamp dwellers.

Fonville rode a bicycle and, in later years, he hosted challenging Sunday brunch/bicycle tours of Baton Rouge.

In 1991, Marval Editions published Cajun: Fonville Winans by Ben Forkner. This was the first major collection of Winans, leading to a Paris exhibit of his works and a visit to France by the photographer later that same year.

Fonville Winans died in Louisiana on September 13, 1992.

== Legacy ==
A portion of Fonville's work is stored in Hill Memorial Library, located on the campus of Louisiana State University in Baton Rouge.

In 1995, LSU Press issued Fonville Winans' Louisiana: Politics, People, and Places, a collection of over one hundred images by Fonville with a foreword by Louisiana politico James Carville and an afterword by noted contemporary Louisiana photographer C.C. Lockwood.

In 1999, Fonville's studio joined the National Register of Historic Places.
