= Ansel Adams Award for Conservation Photography =

Ansel Adams Award for Photography
- Description: Honoring photographers who use their talents in conservation efforts
- Country: United States
- Presented by: Sierra Club
- Website: www.sierraclub.org

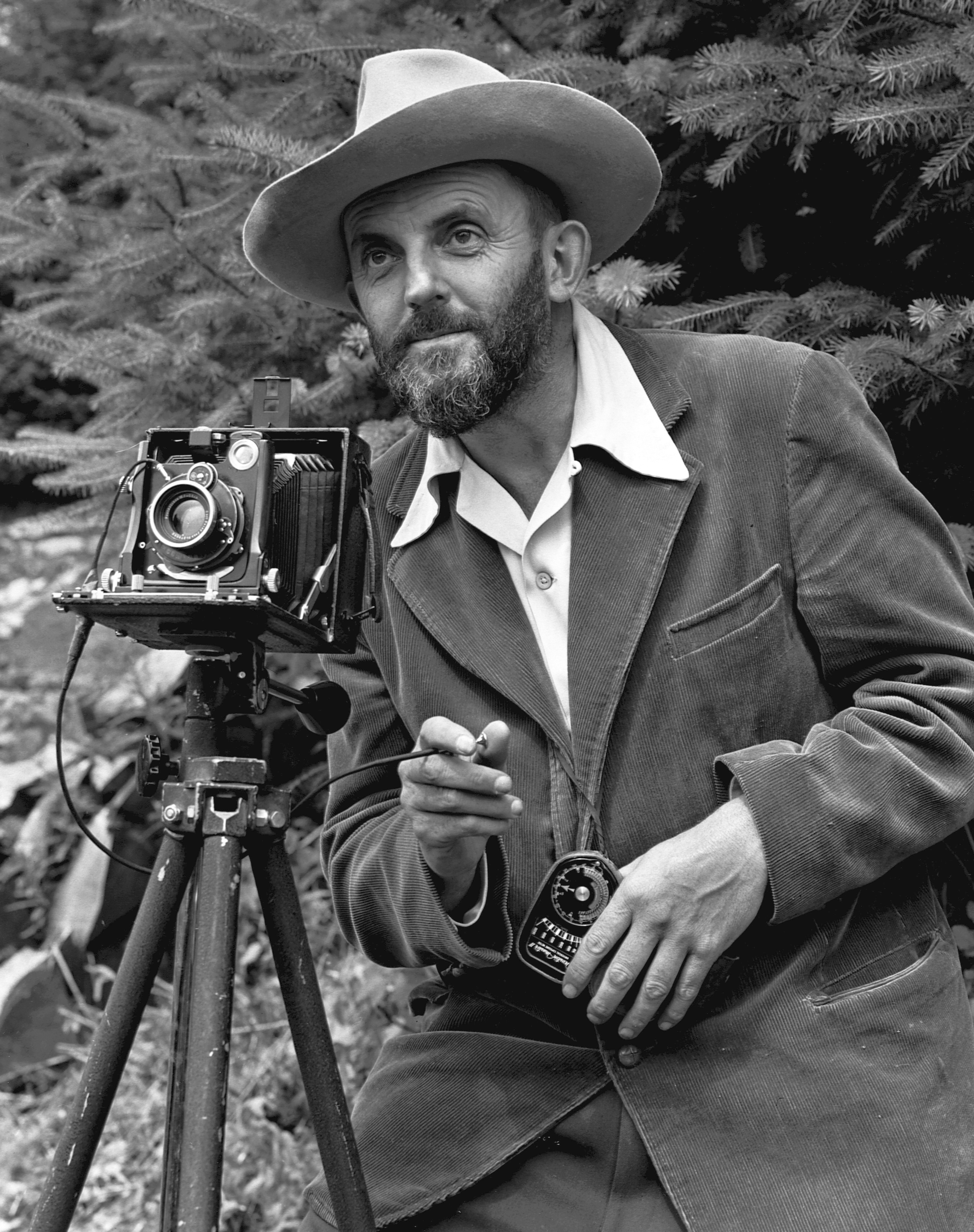
Photographic portrait of nature photographer Ansel Adams

The Ansel Adams Award for Photography, formally called Ansel Adams Award for Conservation Photography, named in honor of American photographer Ansel Adams, is a photography award administered by the Sierra Club. The award "honor[s] photographers who have used their talents in conservation efforts."

== List of recipients ==
- 1971 — Donald M. Bradburn
- 1972 — Beverly Steveson
- 1973 — Leonard Berkowitz (1919-2007)
- 1974 — Bruce Barnbaum
- 1976 — C. Scott Heppel
- 1978 — C.C. Lockwood
- 1981 — Ernie Day
- 1983 — Dewitt Jones
- 1984 — Galen Rowell
- 1985 — Tupper Ansel Blake
- 1986 — Robert M. Lindholm
- 1988 — Tom Algire
- 1989 — Robert Glenn Ketchum
- 1990 — Edward Schell
- 1991 — Stephen Trimble
- 1992 — J. D. Marston
- 1993 — John Fielder
- 1995 — William Neill
- 1997 — Frans Lanting
- 1998 — Jim Stimson
- 2000 — Clyde Butcher
- 2001 — Robin Way
- 2002 — Jack Jeffrey
- 2003 — Douglas Steakley
- 2004 — Ken Adelman and Gabrielle Adelman
- 2005 — Larry Allen
- 2006 — Gary Braasch
- 2007 — Wilbur Mills
- 2008 — Steven Kazlowski
- 2009 — Joshua Wolfe
- 2010 — Chris Jordan
- 2011 — Ian Shive
- 2012 — Florian Schulz
- 2013 — James Balog
- 2014 — Krista Schlyer
- 2015 — Boyd Norton
- 2016 — Nick Brandt
- 2017 — Michael Forsberg
- 2018 — Thomas D. Mangelsen
- 2019 — Tim Palmer
- 2020 — Rob Badger and Nita Winter
- 2021 — Joel Sartore
- 2022 — QT Luong
- 2024 — Carlton Ward Jr.
- 2025 — Peter McBride

== See also ==
- Conservation in the United States
- List of environmental awards
