= Mithridatism =

Self-dosing with poison to gain immunity

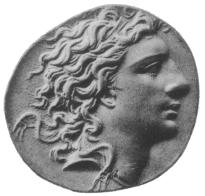
Mithradates VI Eupator, reputed for intentionally consuming poison to build immunity

Mithridatism is the practice of protecting oneself against a poison by gradually self-administering non-lethal amounts. The word is derived from Mithridates VI, the king of Pontus, who so feared being poisoned that he regularly ingested small doses, aiming to develop immunity.

== Background ==
Mithridates VI's father, Mithridates V, was assassinated by poisoning by a conspiracy among his attendants. After this, Mithridates VI's mother held regency over Pontus (a Hellenistic kingdom, 281 BC – 62 AD) until a male heir came of age. Mithridates was in competition with his brother for the throne and his mother began to favor his brother. Supposedly, during his youth, he began to suspect plots against him at his own mother's orders and was aware of her possible connection with his father's death. He then began to notice pains in his stomach during his meals and suspected his mother had ordered small amounts of poison to be added to his food to slowly kill him off. With other assassination attempts, he fled into the wild.

While in the wild, it is said that he began ingesting non-lethal amounts of poisons and mixing many into a universal remedy to make him immune to all known poisons.

After Mithridates' death, many Roman physicians claimed to possess and improve the formula. In keeping with most medical practices of his era, Mithridates' anti-poison routines included a religious component, supervised by the Agari, a group of Scythian shamans who never left him.

It has been suggested that Russian mystic Rasputin's survival of a poisoning attempt was due to mithridatism, but this has not been proven.

Indian epics talk about this practice as well. It has been said that, during the rule of the king Chandragupta Maurya (320–298 BC), there was a practice of selecting beautiful girls and administering poison in small amounts until they grew up, thus making them insensitive to poison. These maidens were called vishakanyas (visha 'poison' + kanya 'maiden'). It was believed that engaging in sexual activities with vishakanyas could result in the death of their partners, due to the exchange of poisonous body fluids. Vishakanyas were employed to kill enemies.

The emperor Bindusara was the son of the first Mauryan emperor Chandragupta Maurya and his queen Durdhara. According to the Rajavalikatha, a Jain work, the original name of this emperor was Simhasena. A legend mentioned in the Jain texts tells the story of how Chandragupta's Guru and advisor Chanakya used to feed the emperor with small doses of poison to build his immunity against possible poisoning attempts by his enemies. One day, Chandragupta, unaware that his food contained poison, shared his food with his pregnant wife, Queen Durdhara, who was seven days away from delivery. The queen, who was not immune to the poison, collapsed and died within a few minutes. Chanakya entered the room at the moment she collapsed, and in order to save the child in the womb, he immediately cut open the dead queen's belly and took the baby out. He was just in time; a drop of poison had already reached the baby and touched his head, leaving a permanent blueish spot (a "bindu") on his forehead. Thus, the newborn was named "Bindusara".

== In practice ==
Mithridatism is not effective against all types of poison. Immunity is generally only possible with biologically complex types which the immune system can respond to. Depending on the toxin, the practice can lead to the lethal accumulation of a poison in the body. Results depend on how each poison is processed by the body, i.e. on how the toxic compound is metabolized or passed out of the body.

However, in some cases, it is possible to build up a metabolic tolerance against specific non-biological poisons. This involves conditioning the liver to produce more of the particular enzymes that metabolize these poisons. For example, heavy drinkers develop a tolerance to the effects of alcohol. However, metabolic tolerance can also lead to accumulation of the less toxic metabolized compound which can slowly damage the liver. With alcohol this generally leads to conditions such as alcoholic fatty liver disease.

Metabolic tolerance is not effective on all types of non-biological poisons. Exposure to certain toxic substances, such as hydrofluoric acid and heavy metals, is either lethal or has little to no effect. A minor exception is cyanide, which can be metabolized by the liver. The enzyme rhodanese converts the cyanide into the much less toxic thiocyanate. This process allows humans to ingest small amounts of cyanide in food like apple seeds and survive small amounts of cyanide gas from fires and cigarettes. However, one cannot effectively condition the liver against cyanide, unlike alcohol. Relatively larger amounts of cyanide are still highly lethal because, while the body can produce more rhodanese, the process also requires large amounts of sulfur-containing substrates.

== In literature ==
Mithridatism has been used as a plot device in fiction and on-screen; including the Indian fantasy series Chandrakanta, Alexandre Dumas's The Count of Monte Cristo, Holly Black's The Folk of the Air series, Nathaniel Hawthorne's Rappaccini's Daughter, Yoshiaki Kawajiri's Ninja Scroll, Dorothy Sayers's Strong Poison, Agatha Christie's Curtain, the web novel and manhwa Roxana (also known as How to Protect the Heroine’s Older Brother), the manga/anime Spy x Family, the manga/anime/light novel series The Apothecary Diaries, William Goldman's The Princess Bride (as well as its film adaptation), and the American historical series The Borgias.

In Michael Curtis Ford's historical novel The Last King, on the life and conquests of Mithridates VI, the technique is used by Mithridates.

A. E. Housman's "Terence, this is stupid stuff" (originally published in A Shropshire Lad) invokes mithridatism as a metaphor for the benefit that serious poetry brings to the reader. The final section is a poetic rendition of the Mithridates legend.

== See also ==
- Allergen immunotherapy
- Hormesis
- Hydra effect
- Mithridate
- Vaccination
