= Supertone =

Supertone may refer to:

- Supertone Records
- The Supertones Band, a West Indian band
- Supertones, a Christian ska band
- A guitar developed by Charles Brasher
