= Brasch =

Brasch is a German and Danish surname, a variant of Braasch. Notable people with the surname include:

- Moritz Brasch (1843–1895), Polish-German philosopher
- Frederick Edward Brasch (1875–1967), American astronomer, librarian, and historian of science
- Charles Orwell Brasch (1909–1973), New Zealand poet, literary editor, arts patron
- Arno Brasch (1910–1963), German physician; (de)
- Rudolph Brasch (1912–2004), German-Australian rabbi, author
- Horst Brasch (1922–1989), German politician (de)
- Thomas Brasch (1945–2001), German writer, dramatist, editor, lyricist
- Walter M. Brasch (1945–2017), American journalist
- Klaus Brasch (1950–1980), German actor; (de)
- Lydia Brasch (born 1953), American politician
- Peter Brasch (1955–2001), German writer; (de)
- Paul Brasch (born 1964), Australian stand-up comedian
- Caroline Brasch Nielsen (born 1993), Danish model

== See also ==
- Braasch
- Brash (disambiguation)
