= Boyd Norton =

American photographer

Boyd Norton (born April 8, 1936) is an American photographer, known for his work in wilderness photography and his environmental activism. He is the photographer/author of 17 books covering topics such as from African elephants, mountain gorillas, Siberia's Lake Baikal and issues of Alaskan and Rocky Mountain conservation. He contributed photographs to the Environmental Protection Agency's Documerica project in the early 1970s.

== Life and career ==
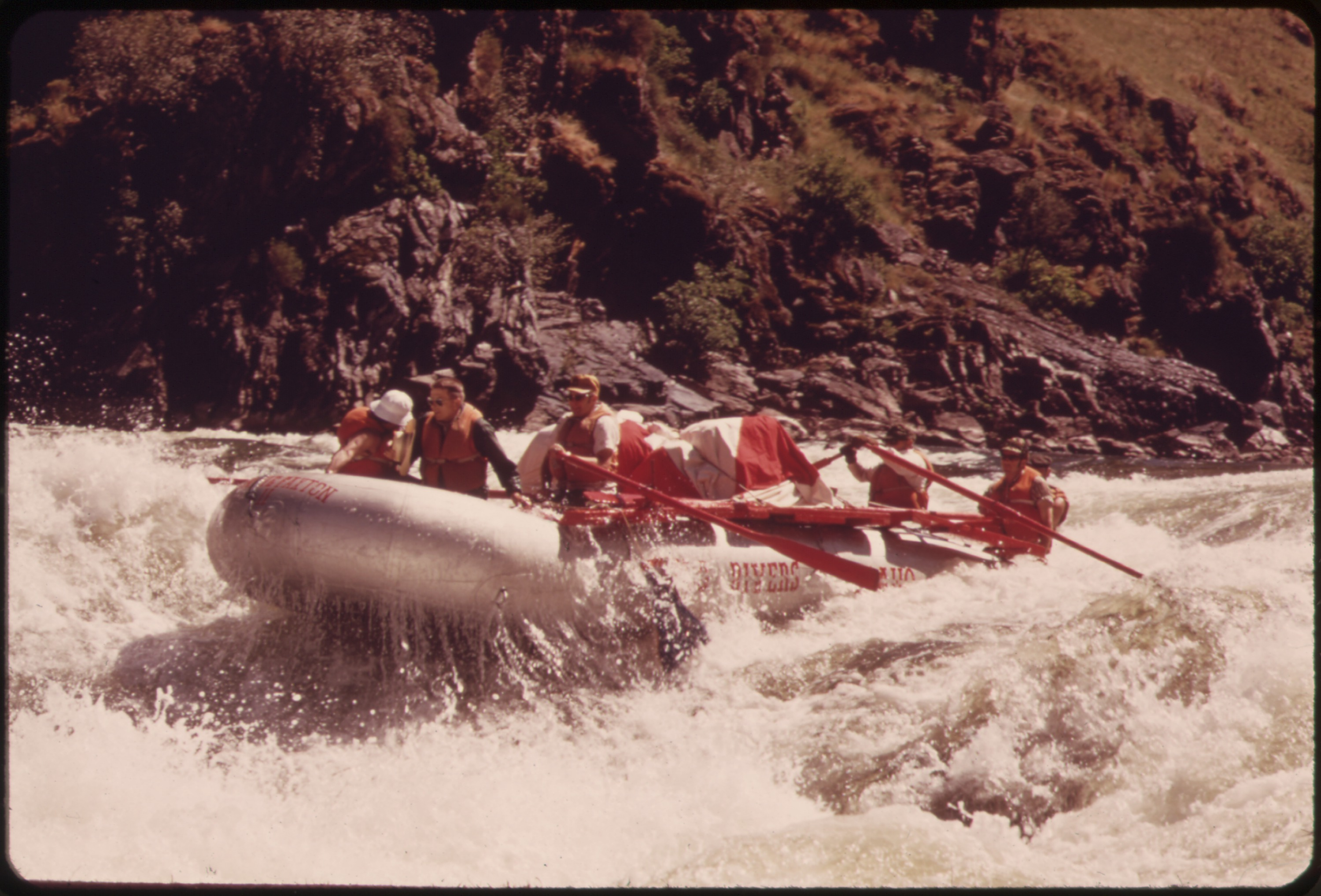
Rafting in Hells Canyon (1973) by Boyd Norton

In August 1960, during a cross-country trip to California, Norton fell in love with the Teton Range and took a job as a nuclear scientist with the United States Atomic Energy Commission in Idaho Falls, Idaho so that he could live nearby. Hells Canyon, located at the border of Oregon and Idaho, was the first place where Norton used his photography to further an environmental cause. In 1969, his photographs of Hells Canyon were instrumental in convincing Oregon Senator Bob Packwood to introduce the establishing Hells Canyon National Recreation Area. His photographs also helped establish Jedediah Smith Wilderness next to Grand Teton National Park, and the Sawtooth National Wilderness.

His book Alaska: Wilderness Frontier described the lands that would be protected by the Alaska National Interest Lands Conservation Act. At his request, copies of the book were sent to every member of congress.

Since then, his environmental activism has extended worldwide. In 1990, together with David Brower, he lobbied Russian Foreign Minister Edward Shevardnadze to gain support for the designation of Siberia's Lake Baikal as a World Heritage Site. The book with his photographs that chronicles the journey taken by Peter Matthiessen brought Lake Baikal to the attention of English-language readers.

In 2010, Norton and Dave Blanton co-founded Serengeti Watch to oppose a commercial highway across the Serengeti National Park. His book Serengeti: The Eternal Beginning resulting from 26 years of photography in the Serengeti was called a "huge success as a platform for conservation." He has himself written a Conservation Photography Handbook.

Boyd Norton is a founder and Fellow of the International League of Conservation Photographers. He was on the board of directors for the North American Nature Photography Association. In 2015, he received the Sierra Club's Ansel Adams Award for Conservation Photography.

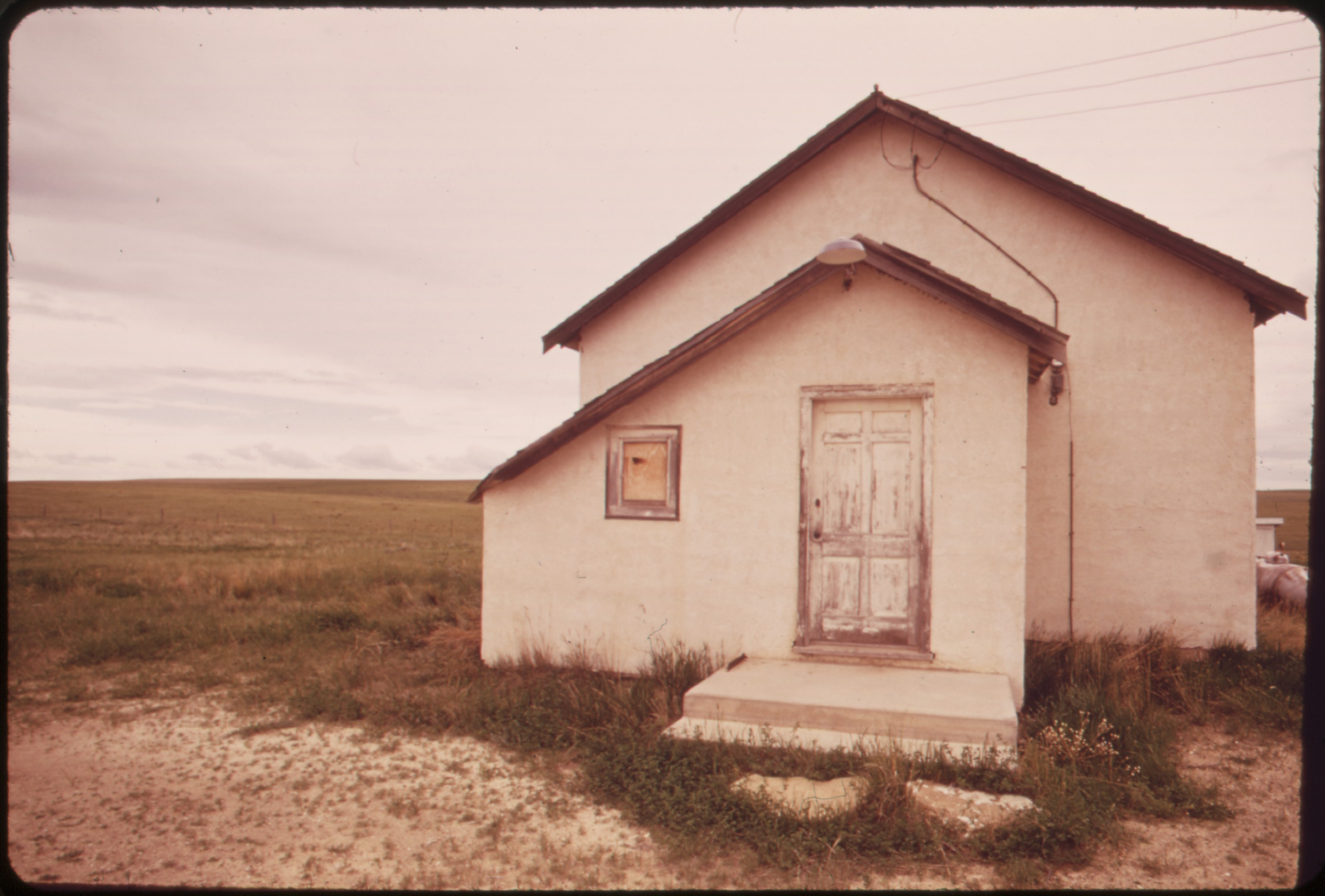

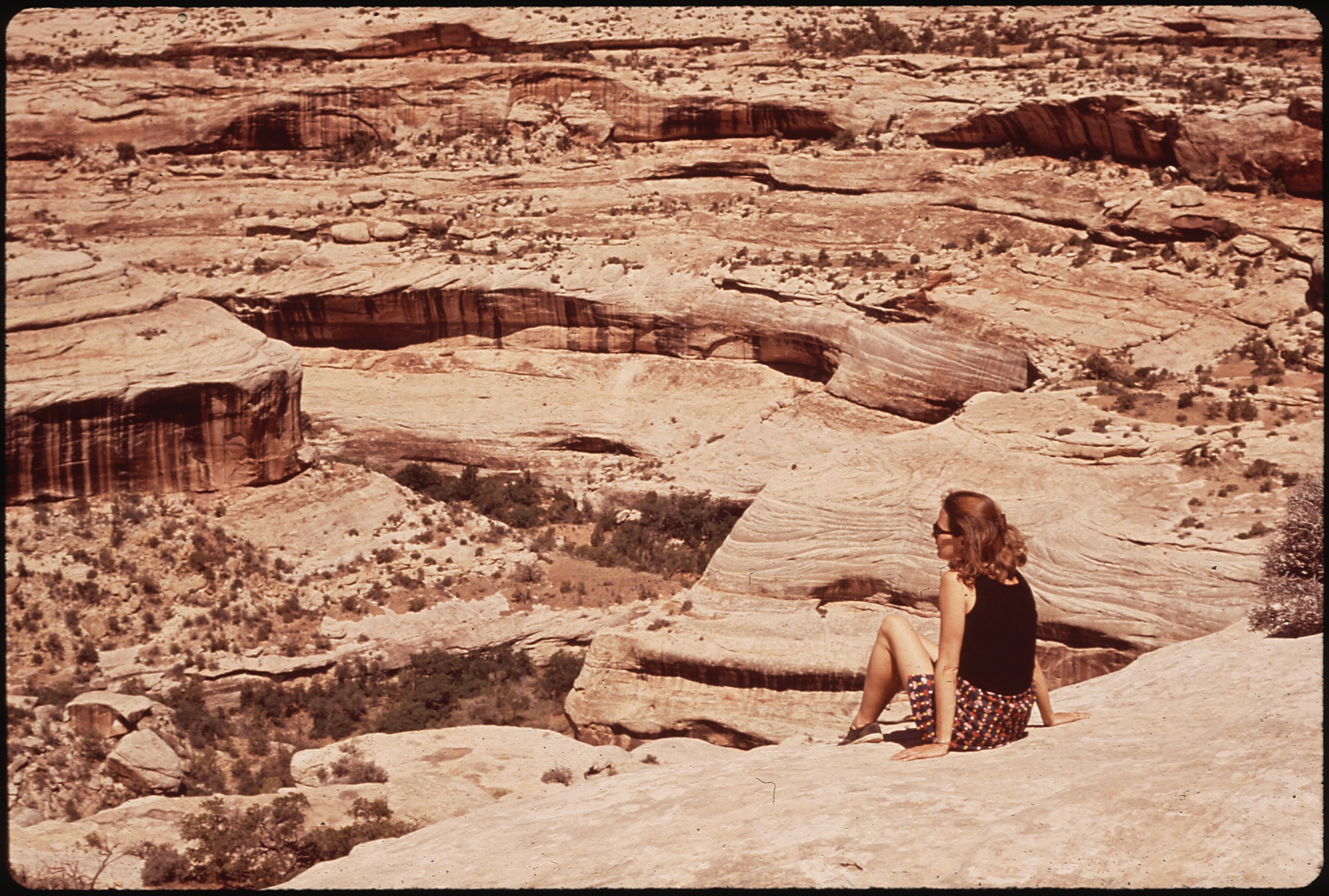

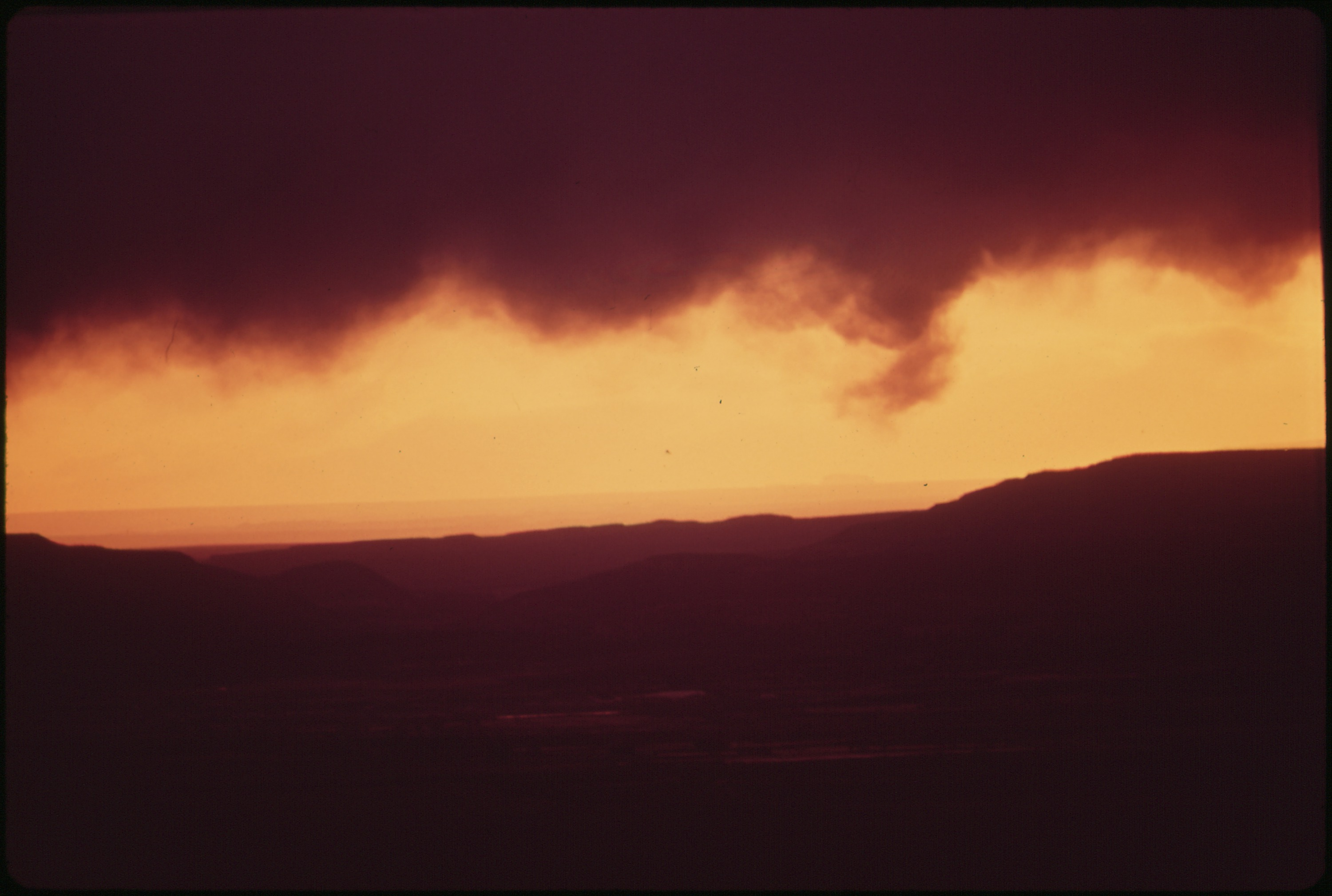

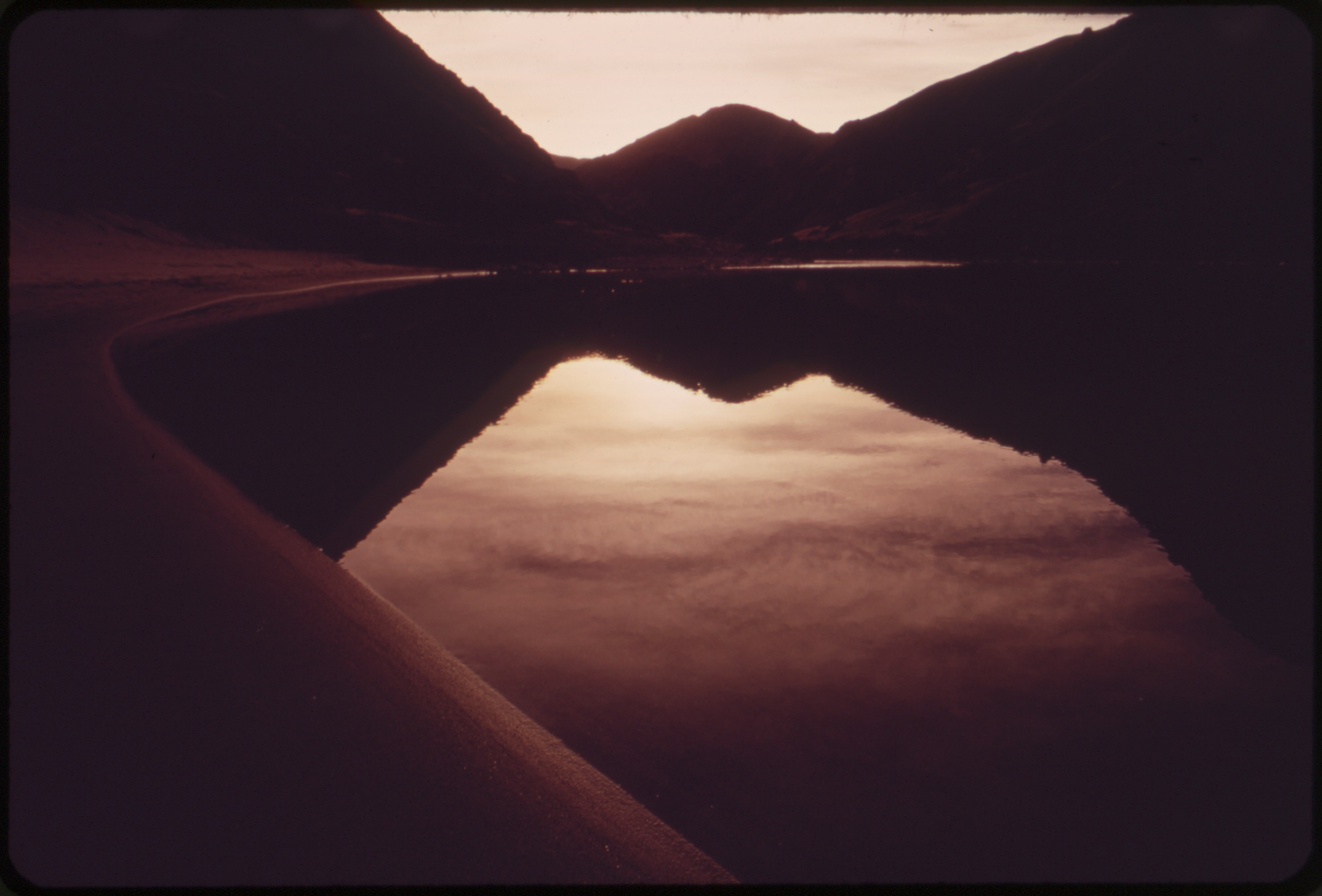

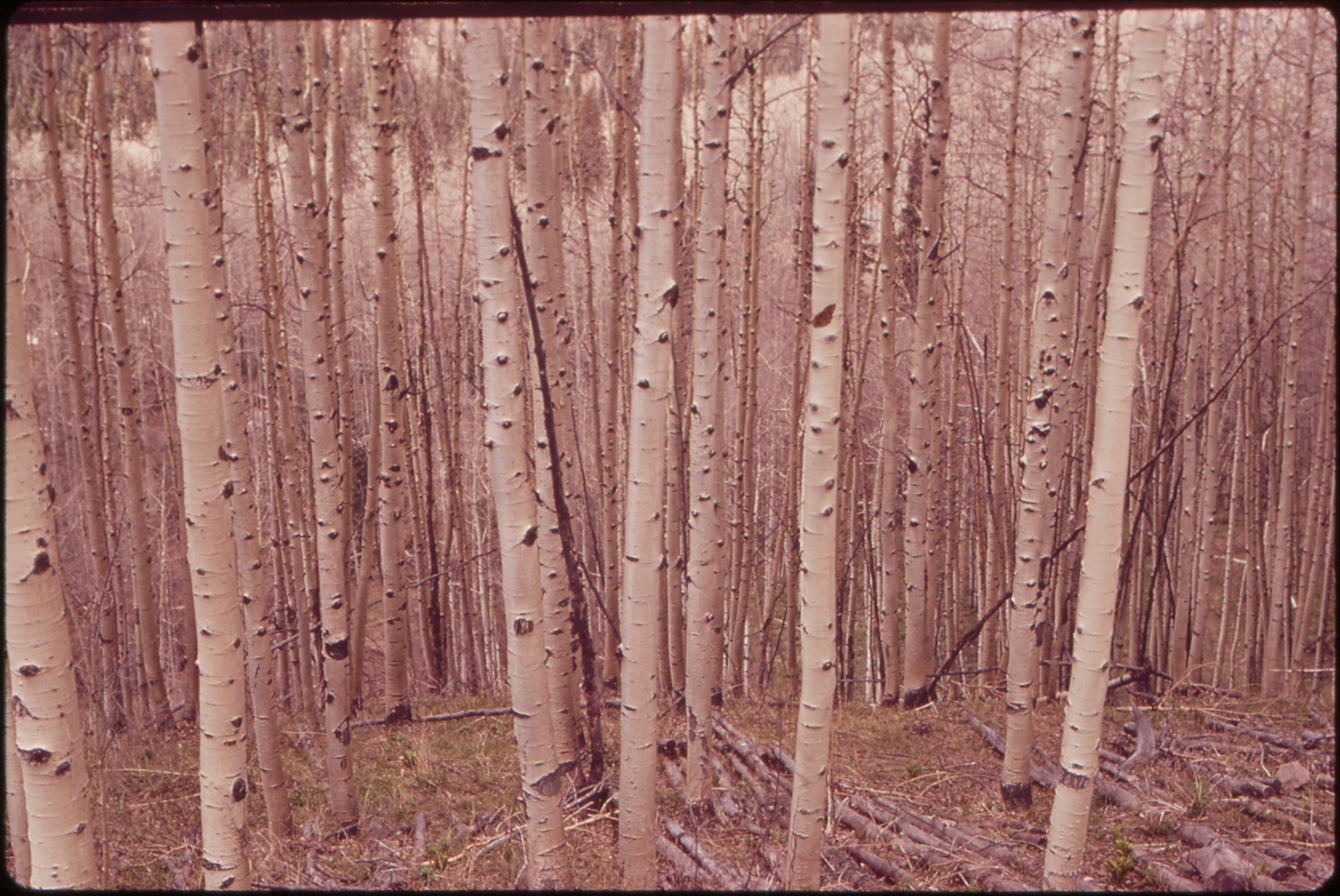

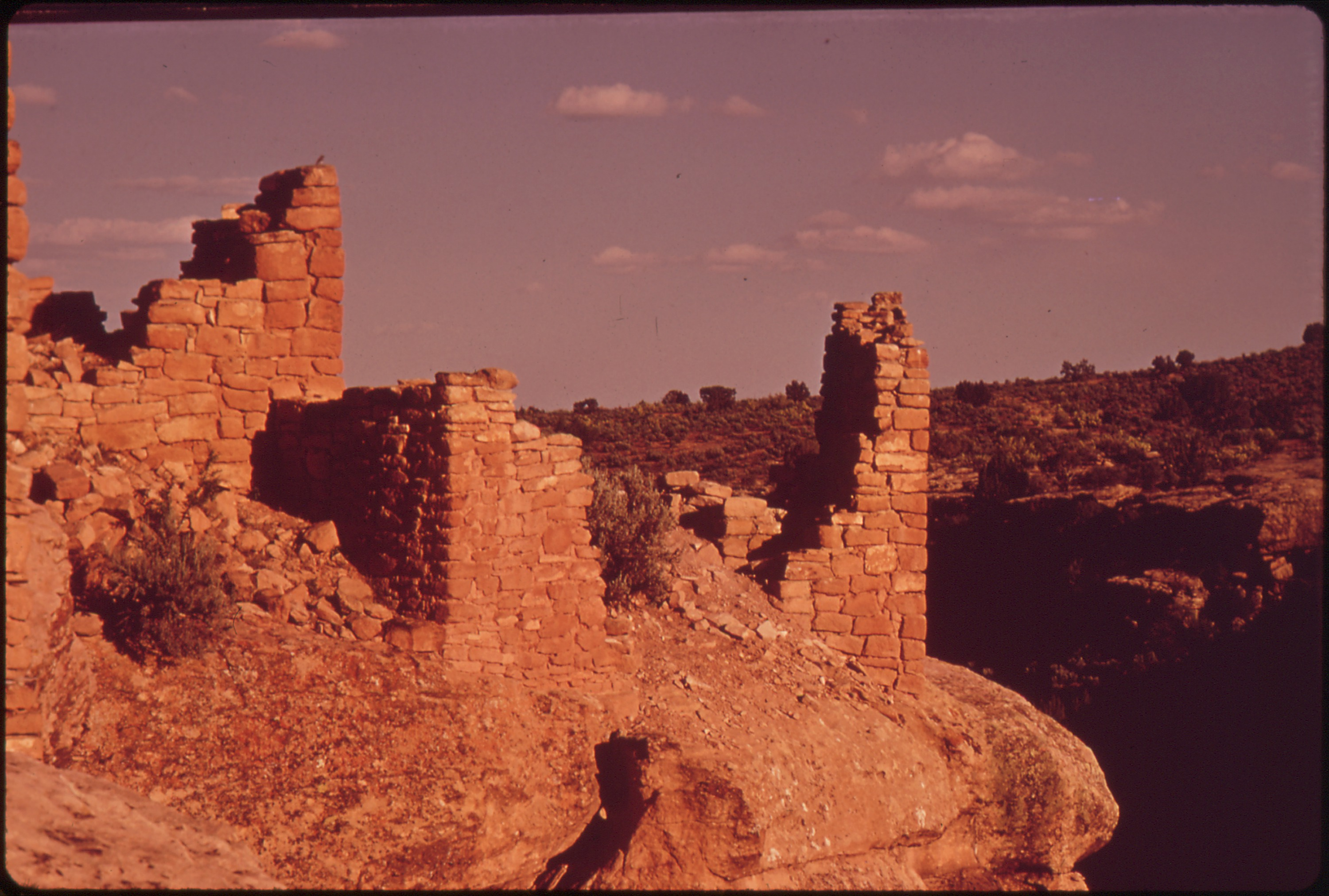

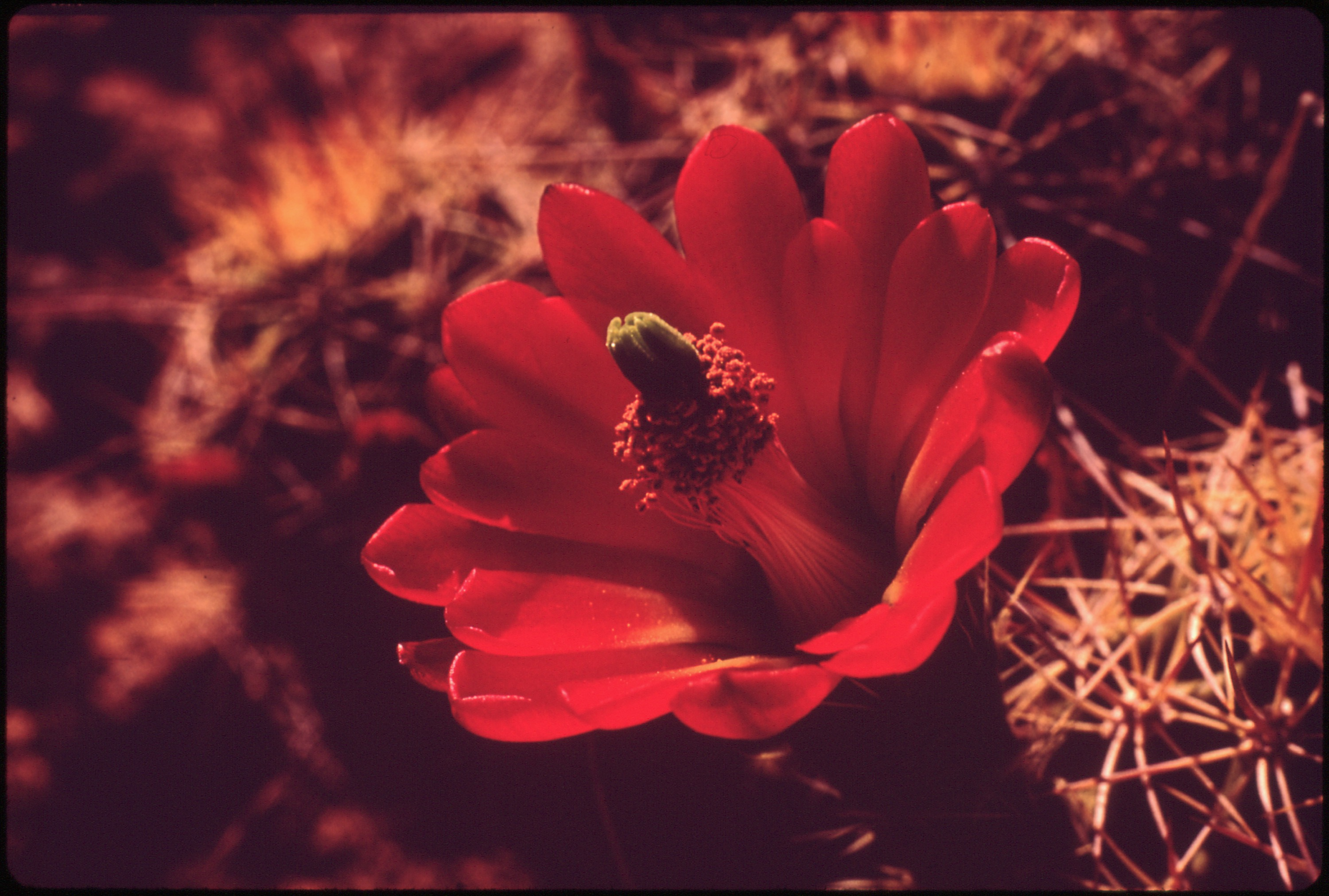

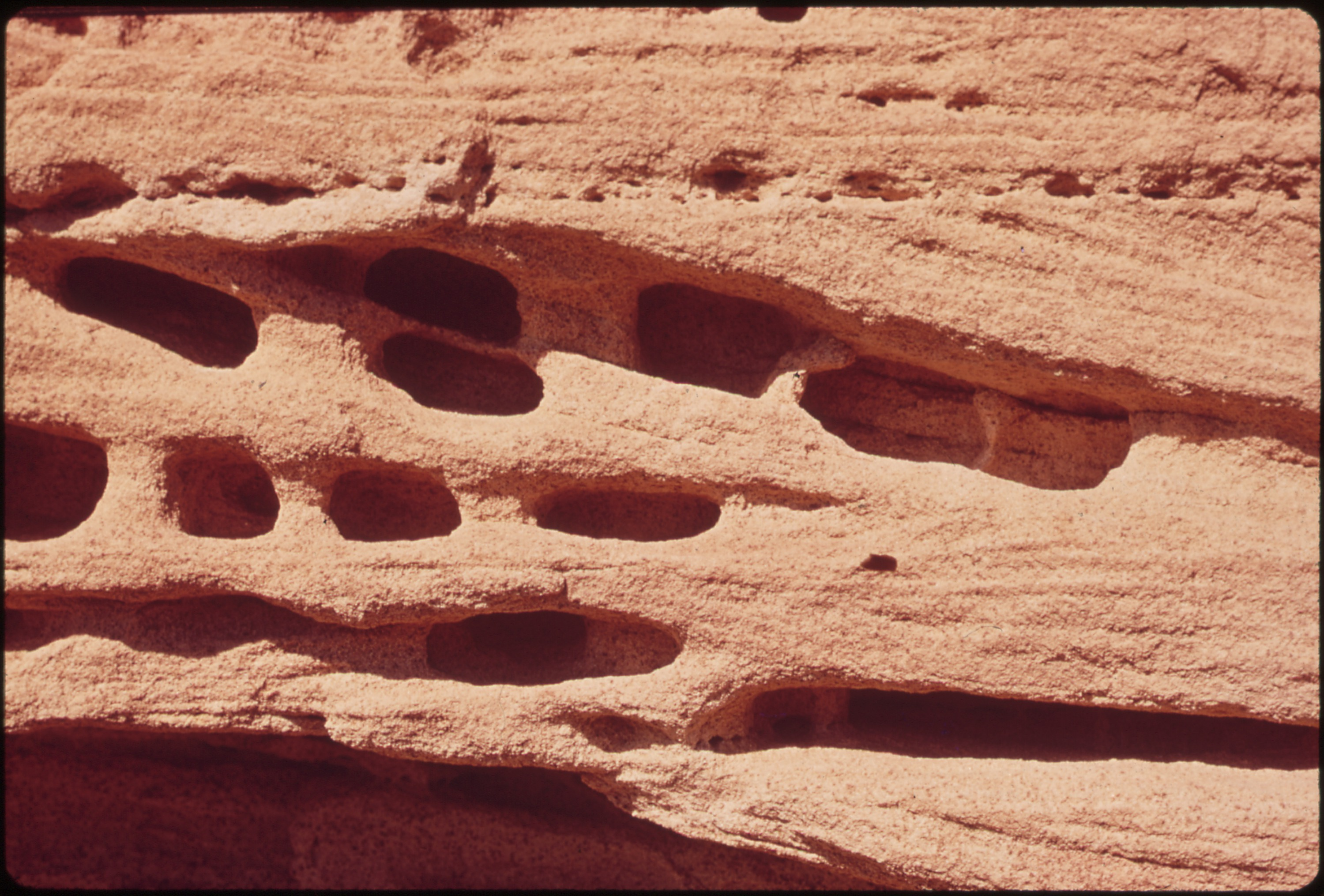

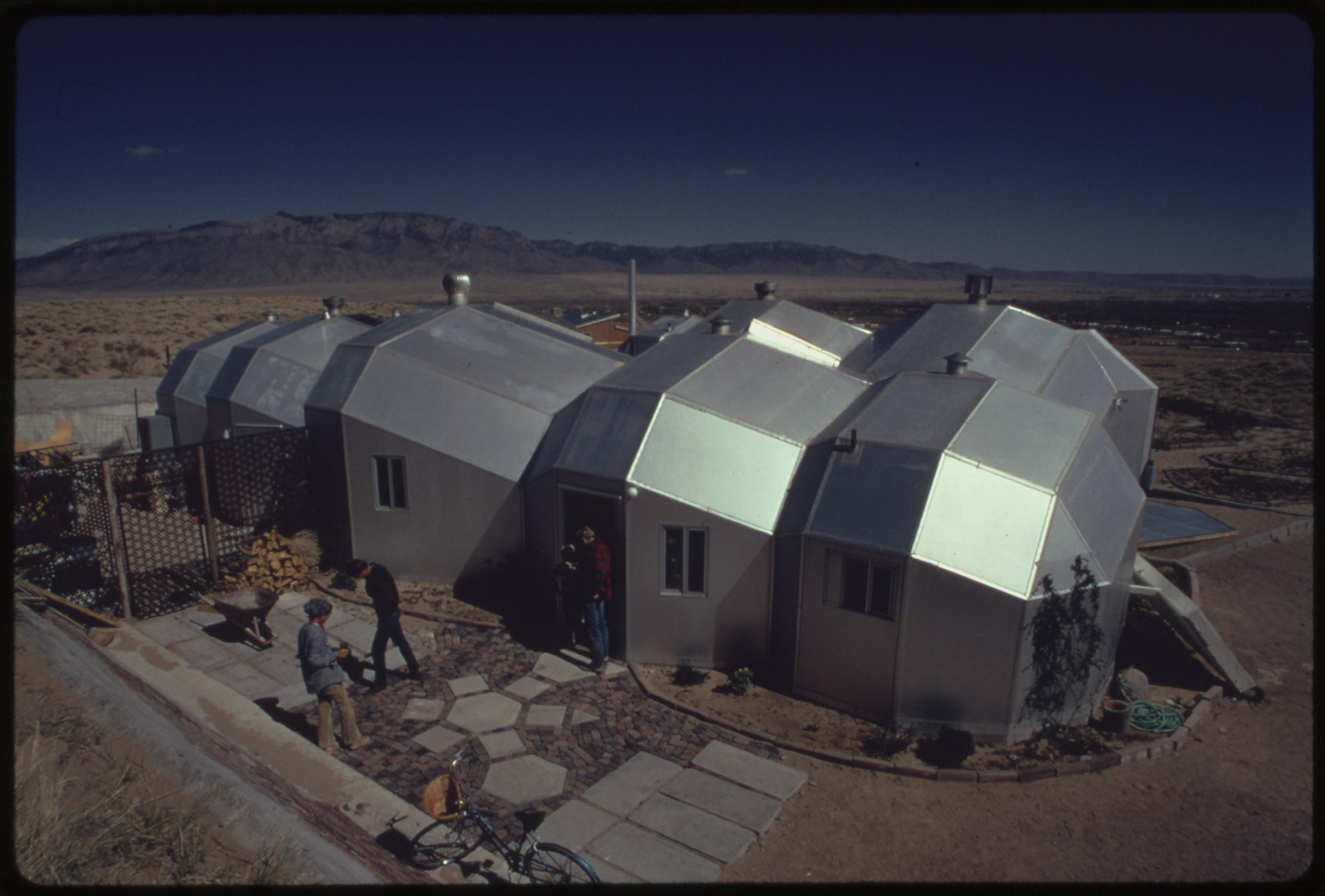

== Books ==
- Conservation Photography Handbook: How to Save the World One Photo at a Time, Amherst Media, 2016 ISBN 978-1608959853
- Serengeti: The Ethernal Beginning, Fulcrum Publishing, 2011 ISBN 978-1555915933
- Baikal: Sacred Sea of Siberia, Sierra Club, 1995 ISBN 978-0871563583
- The African Elephant: The Last Days of Eden Voyageur Press, 1991 ISBN 978-1853102912
- The Mountain Gorilla, Voyageur Press, 1990 ISBN 978-0896581340
- Divided Twins: Alaska and Siberia, Viking Studio, 1988 ISBN 978-0670819515
- Alaska: Wilderness Frontier, Reader's Digest Press, 1977 ISBN 978-0070474697
- Rivers of the Rockies, Rand McNally, 1975 ISBN 978-0528810121
- The Grand Tetons, Viking, 1974 ISBN 0670347779
- Snake Wilderness, Sierra Club, 1972 ISBN 0871560615
