= Baasch =

Baasch is a German surname. Notable people with the surname include:

- Johannes Baasch (1905–1944), German World War II officer
- Ulrich Baasch (1890–?), German-Russian athlete
- Baasch (musician), a Polish musician

== See also ==
- Braasch
