= Robert M. Lindholm =

American photographer (1935–2018)

Robert "Bob" Lindholm (June 14, 1935 – April 16, 2018) was an American photographer.

Lindholm grew up in St. Louis, Missouri. He has a degree in radio and television production from the College of Arts and Science at the University of Missouri in Columbia, Missouri. After he was in the U.S. Marine Corps, he received a law degree from the University of Missouri in 1964. He is a distinguished alumnus. In 1986, the Sierra Club awarded him the Ansel Adams Award for Conservation Photography.

His photographs have appeared in Outdoor America, Conservationist, Missouri Conservationist, Missouri Life, American Land Forum, and Outdoors Unlimited. A story about his exhibition, "Perspective On the Land," was featured in Shutterbug magazine in 2003. The exhibition featured Lindholm's black and white photography paired with excerpts from the writings of another famous St. Louis resident, Charles Lindbergh. Lindholm received numerous honors and awards, including the Ansel Adams Award from the Sierra Club in 1986, the Jade Chiefs Award from the Outdoor Writers Association of America, and was named a Distinguished Alumnus of the University of Missouri in 1997.

He served as an Assistant Attorney General in Missouri under John Ashcroft, where he did work for the Department of Natural Resources and the Clean Water Commission. Lindholm was also instrumental in the transformation of the MKT Railroad into the 200-mile KATY Trail. He retired from the Attorney General's Office in 1993 and turned to photography. Lindholm's photos are featured in a 2013 book he co-authored with W. Raymond Wood, Karl Bodmer's America Revisited: Landscape Views Across Time. The book compares Bodmer's early 19th-century American landscape paintings with Lindholm's photographs of the same locations.

Lindholm died on April 16, 2018, at the age of 81.
