= Douglas Steakley =

Metalsmith & photographer

- Born: Ralph Douglas Steakley, Jr. March 21, 1944 (age 82); Ashtabula, Ohio, U.S.
- Education: Bowling Green State University; Indiana University Bloomington
- Occupations: Metalsmith, Photographer
- Awards: Ansel Adams Award for Conservation Photography, 2003

Douglas Steakley (born March 21, 1944, in Ashtabula, Ohio) is a metalsmith and photographer who won the Ansel Adams Award for Conservation Photography in 2003.

== Career ==
Steakley has a BA from Bowling Green State University and studied jewelry design and silversmithing at Indiana University Bloomington, where he received a master of fine arts degree. In 1974, he traveled to Denmark to learn holloware techniques. His work is featured in the Smithsonian American Art Museum collection. In 1979, he wrote Holloware Techniques, a book published by Watson-Guptill Publications. He was the president of the Society of North American Goldsmiths, from 1989 to 1991.

Steakley's book Pacific Light: Images of the Monterey Peninsula was published in 2000, and Big Sur and Beyond: The Legacy of the Big Sur Land Trust was published in 2001. In 2003, he became a full-time photographer. Later that year he received the Ansel Adams Award for Conservation Photography from the Sierra Club. His A Photographer's Guide to the California Coast was published in 2005 by Countryman Press. He has also published Photographing Big Sur. His photography has been in magazines including Outside, Architectural Digest, Backpacker, Art and Antiques, National Geographic, and Town and Country.

Steakley has worked with conservation groups including the Big Sur Land Trust, The Nature Conservancy, the Land Trust Alliance, The Trust for Public Land, the Wilderness Coalition, the Tuolumne River Trust, and the Monterey Peninsula Regional Parks District.

== Bibliography ==
- Holloware Techniques (1979)
- Pacific Light: Images of the Monterey Peninsula (2000)
- Big Sur and Beyond: The Legacy of The Big Sur Land Trust (2001)
- A Photographer's Guide to the California Coast (2005)
- Photographing Big Sur (2011)
- Big Sur Revealed (2017)
