= Robert Glenn Ketchum =

American photographer

Robert Glenn Ketchum (born December 1, 1947) is an American conservation photographer, recognized by Audubon magazine as one of 100 people "who shaped the environmental movement in the 20th century.".

== Life and career ==
Ketchum attended high school at the Webb School of California. He received a B.A. in design from UCLA and a MFA from the California Institute of the Arts in 1974. He studied photography under the direction of Edmund Teske and Robert Heinecken. After he graduated he began a lifelong friendship with Eliot Porter, who helped form his ideas about photography and about how photography can be used to help change the world. His commitment to conservation photography is unique amongst academically-trained photographers.

Prior to his emergence as a photographer, he was a widely recognized curator, discovering the Paul Outerbridge, Jr. estate, and bringing recognition to the overlooked work of James Van Der Zee. He was also Curator of Photography for the National Park Foundation for 15 years, and in this capacity authored American Photographers and the National Parks (1981).

After the publication of this last title, Ketchum began to concentrate on environmentally focused projects. Although his conservation photography encompasses many areas from Mexico to Canada, his most influential work was done in Alaska, the location of four books with Aperture. His book The Tongass: Alaska's Vanishing Rain Forest (1987) was instrumental in helping to pass the Tongass Timber Reform Bill of 1990. He subsequently turned his attention to Southwest Alaska with Rivers of Life: Southwest Alaska, The Last Great Salmon Fishery (2001) and Wood-Tikchik: Alaska¹s Largest State Park (2003), advocating for the protection of Bristol Bay from the industrial invasion of oil and gas leasing and the largest open pit mine in the world. In 2010, the Obama administration withdrew Bristol Bay from oil and gas lease consideration.

Ketchum and his close friend master printer Michael Wilder pioneered Cibachrome color printmaking in the early 1970s. They were also among the first contemporary photographers to explore print scale. Ketchum's very dimensional prints large color prints were distinctive at that time.

Ketchum has extended the traditional media of the photographic prints in several ways. He has been working with a guild of embroiderers in China translating his imagery into wall hangings, table screens and standing, multi-panel floor screens using historic craft dating back from 2500 years. More recently, he created the company RGK THREADS to bring photographic images from the natural world to bolt fabric design.

Ketchum has had over 400 one-man and group shows, and his photographs are in major museum collections throughout the world, including the Museum of Modern Art (New York City), the National Museum of American Art (Washington, D.C.), the Museum of Contemporary Art, Los Angeles, and the Metropolitan Museum of Art (New York City), to name a few. Significant archives of more than 100 images have been acquired by the Amon Carter Museum in Texas and the Huntington Library in Los Angeles, and substantial bodies of work can be found at the High Museum in Atlanta, the Los Angeles County Museum of Art, the Akron Art Museum, The Cantor Museum of Stanford University and the Herbert F. Johnson Museum of Cornell University.

He is the founder of the Advocacy Arts Foundation, and a founding Fellow of the International League of Conservation Photographers.

== Selected awards, honors, and recognition ==
- Ansel Adams Award for Conservation Photography, 1989 – from the Sierra Club; a career award "for effectively combining outstanding photography with conservation advocacy."
- United Nations Outstanding Environmental Achievement Award, 1991 – "For outstanding practical achievements in the protection and improvement of the environment"
- Golden Light Awards/Photographic Book of the Year Competition, 1994 – for The Legacy Of Wildness: The Photographs of Robert Glenn Ketchum
- Chevron – Times Mirror Magazines Conservation Awards, 1995
- Outstanding Person of the Year 2000 by Photo Media magazine.
- 2001 Outstanding Photographer of the Year by the North American Nature Photography Association
- Lifetime Achievement Award in Photography and Conservation 2002 – given by the Aperture Foundation of New York
- 2009 'Partner in Conservation Award' from the U.S. Department of the Interior
- Included in the Master Series from American Photo magazine in 2010 (Ketchum was the first conservation photographer to receive the distinction)

== Books ==
- Cahn, Robert and Robert Glenn Ketchum. American Photographers and the National Parks. Viking Press, Inc., New York, NY, 1981.
- Ketchum, Robert Glenn. The Hudson River and the Highlands. Aperture, New York, NY, 1985.
- Ketchum, Robert Glenn and Carey D. The Tongass: Alaska's Vanishing Rain Forest. Aperture, New York, NY, 1987.
- Callison, Charles and Robert Glenn Ketchum. Overlooked in America: The Success and Failure of Federal Land Management. Aperture, New York, NY, 1991.
- Ketchum, Robert Glenn, and John Perlin. The Legacy of Wildness: The Photographs of Robert Glenn Ketchum. Aperture, New York, NY, 1993.
- various authors and photographers. Tatshenshini River Wild. Raincoast Books, Vancouver, BC, 1993.
- Ketchum, Robert Glenn and Barry Lopez. Northwest Passage. Aperture, New York, NY, 1996.
- Ketchum, Robert Glenn and Theodore Roosevelt Gardner II. Nature's Kaleidoscope: The Santa Barbara Botanic Garden. Allen a Knoll Pubs, 1999
- Hampton, Bruce and Robert Glenn Ketchum. Rivers of Life: Southwest Alaska, The Last Great Salmon Fishery. Aperture, New York, NY, 2001.
- Ketchum, Robert Glenn, and Bill Sherwonit. Wood-Tikchik: Alaska's Largest State Park. Aperture, New York, NY, 2003.
- Ketchum, Robert Glenn. Wind River Winderness. Laguna Wilderness Press, Laguna Beach, CA, 2006.
- Rohrbach, John and Robert Glenn Ketchum. Regarding the Land: Robert Glenn Ketchum and the Legacy of Eliot Porter. Amon Carter Museum, 2006.

== Selected exhibitions ==
- May 2010— Robert Glenn Ketchum: A Life in Photography, The G2 Gallery, Venice, CA
- September 2008— Robert Glenn Ketchum: A Life Well Lived, 40 Years in the Making, The G2 Gallery, Venice, CA

September 16, 2006 - January 7, 2007- Robert Glenn Ketchum and Eliot Porter: Regarding the Land", Amon Carter Museum, Fort Worth, TX (40-year retrospective)

March 7 - July 21, 2020, "Robert Glenn Ketchum & Eliot Porter: On Seeing Color", Booth Museum of Western Art, Cartersville, GA (55-year retrospective of 60+ prints)
