= Ian Shive =

American photographer (born 1978)

Ian Shive is a nature photographer, author, film and television producer and founder and chief executive officer of Tandem Stills Motion, Inc based in Los Angeles, California. Shive has worked on assignment with environmental nonprofits, including The Nature Conservancy, The Sierra Club, Environmental Defense Fund and the National Parks Conservation Association. He is the recipient of the 2011 Sierra Club Ansel Adams Award for Conservation Photography. He also appeared in and executive-produced the Discovery Channel television show Tiburones: The Sharks of Cuba which aired on Shark Week 2015.

== Exhibits and publications ==
Shive has exhibited at the G2 Gallery in Venice, California at Edition One gallery in Santa Fe, New Mexico. He is the author of two books about America's National Park System, The National Parks: Our American Landscape and The National Parks: An American Legacy. Both of the books won Nautilus Book Awards.
