= Brasher (surname) =

Brasher is a surname.

== People ==
Notable people with the surname include:

- Charles Brasher, Canadian inventor
- Chris Brasher (1928–2003), British athlete
- Rex Brasher (1869–1960), American painter and ornithologist
- Shirley Brasher (born 1934), British tennis player
- Suzie Brasher (born 1960/61), American figure skater
- Tim Brasher (born 1971), Australian rugby league player
- Tommy Brasher, American football defensive line coach

== Fictional characters ==
- Julia Brasher, a rookie cop assigned to the Hollywood Division who becomes involved with Harry Bosch
