= Bradsher cycloaddition =

Chemical reaction

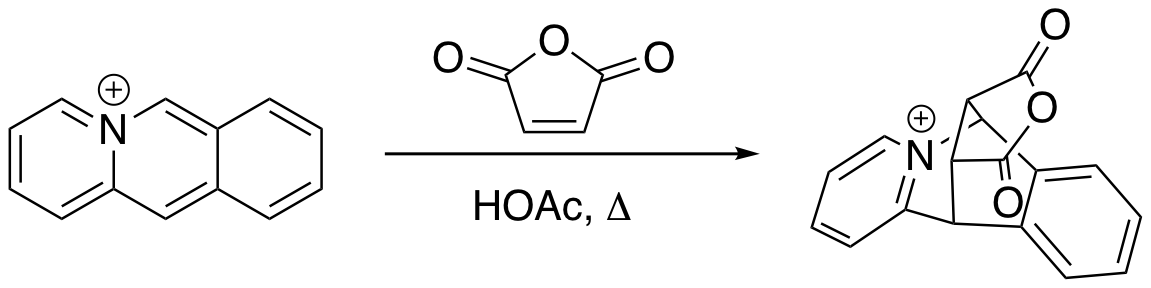
Bradsher [4+2] cycloaddition between pyrido[1,2-b]isoquinolin-5-ium and maleic anhydride in acetic acid, yielding the Diels-Alder adduct (6S,11R,12R,16R)-13,15-dioxo-6,11-dihydro-6,11-[3,4]furanopyrido[1,2-b]isoquinolin-5-ium.

The Bradsher cycloaddition reaction, also known as the Bradsher cyclization reaction, is a form of the Diels–Alder reaction which involves the [4+2] addition of a common dienophile with a cationic aromatic azadiene such as acridizinium or isoquinolinium.

The Bradsher cycloaddition was first reported by C. K. Bradsher and T. W. G. Solomons in 1958.
