= Michael Forsberg =

Michael Forsberg is a conservation photographer who has dedicated 25 years of his life to photograph America's Great Plains, once one of the greatest grassland ecosystems on Earth. He is best known for his images of the Great Plains, wildlife, landscapes, sandhill cranes, and watersheds. His images have been featured in publications including National Geographic, Audubon, Outdoor Photographer, and the Nature Conservancy.

== See also ==
- Conservation photography
- Nature photography
- Wildlife photography
