= Brash (surname) =

Brash is a surname. Notable people with the surname include:

- Alan Brash (1913–2002), Presbyterian minister in New Zealand
- Alan Brash (pharmacologist) (born 1949), Scottish pharmacologist
- Don Brash (born 1940), New Zealand politician
- James Brash (1881–1961), Australian organist, adjudicator and composer
- Jonathan Brash, British politician
- Marion Brash (1931–2022), American actress
- Matt Brash (veterinarian), British veterinarian and television presenter
- Matt Brash (baseball), (born 1998), Canadian baseball player
- Peter Brash (born 1954), American television soap opera writer
- Thomas Brash (1874–1957), New Zealand dairy executive and Presbyterian
- William W. Brash III, American judge
