= Braasch Biotech =

Braasch Biotech LLC is a privately held American company that specializes in the development of biopharmaceutical vaccine products for the human and veterinary healthcare markets. Specifically, Braasch has developed the world's first anti-obesity vaccine. They are also researching applications for Growth Hormone Deficiency and Type 2 diabetes markets.

== History ==
In 2008, Braasch Biotech LLC was incorporated in the State of South Dakota. Their total focus was on developing Somatostatin vaccines and related technology.

In addition to developing and testing its Somatostatin vaccine technology in a variety of species and for different metabolic conditions, the company has also expanded its worldwide intellectual property positions by multiple filings and anticipates several additional filings to support their technology.

== Technology ==
Somatostatin (also known as Growth Hormone Inhibiting Hormone) is the main regulator for the release of Growth Hormone (GH) from the pituitary gland, which leads to several body functions including an increase of IGF-1 (Insulin-like Growth Factor 1) levels. Somatostatin inhibits the actions of Growth Hormone-Releasing Hormone, also a hypothalamus hormone, which controls the release of Growth Hormone.

Braasch's Somatostatin vaccine technology allows the immune system to temporarily reduce, but not eliminate, the mostly inhibitory actions of Somatostatin. The vaccination effect causes more Growth Hormone to be released, which in turn stimulates the release of IGF-1 from the liver. This hormone cascade can help address issues relating to obesity and Type 2 diabetes, since growth hormone deficiencies can lead to increased risk for those conditions.

== Research and development ==
For human applications, Braasch Biotech is focused on human obesity and Type 2 diabetes applications, along with Growth Hormone deficiencies and IGF-1 disorders. In the veterinary field, Braasch has developed vaccines to increase livestock productivity and reduce obesity in pets (dogs, cats, and horses). The applicability of GH and IGF-1 treatments are currently being pursued by many pharmaceutical companies for a variety of human conditions. Based on the success of drug treatments, over time, Braasch will pursue additional applications and intellectual property for their vaccination approach (e.g. development of myocardial infarction treatments).
