= Hydra effect =

Paradox originating from the Greek legend of the Lernaean Hydra

The hydra effect or hydra paradox owes its name to the Greek legend of the Lernaean Hydra which grew two heads for each one cut off, and is used figuratively for counter-intuitive effects of actions to reduce a problem which result in stimulating its multiplication. Most notably, scientists have proposed that ecological systems can exhibit a hydra effect when "a higher death rate in a particular species ultimately increases the size of its population". The hypothesis is suggested to have implications for the eradication of pests, and resource management. There are also said to be indications that reducing the death rate can shrink a population.

The hydra effect has also been used about negative outcomes when shutting down torrent sites which come back in more incarnations, and is cited by those opposing the war on drugs, COVID-19 lockdowns, and targeted killing as counter-productive effects.

== Examples ==
In 2016, the site Torrentz shut down its operations without further information for the cause of the shut-down. Within two weeks, there were three torrent sites that were built as replacements for Torrentz. Similarly, after the torrent website The Pirate Bay was shut down in December 2014, it reincarnated with hundreds of copies within a week.

When Nintendo took legal action against the Switch emulator Yuzu in 2024, numerous forks emerged owing to its open-source nature, though they too were also subject to cease-and-desist orders from the company due to their eventual ownership of the original Yuzu code.

== See also ==
- Braess's paradox
- Paradox of enrichment
- Streisand effect
- Cobra effect
