= California Coastal Records Project =

Aerial photographic project of the Californian coastline

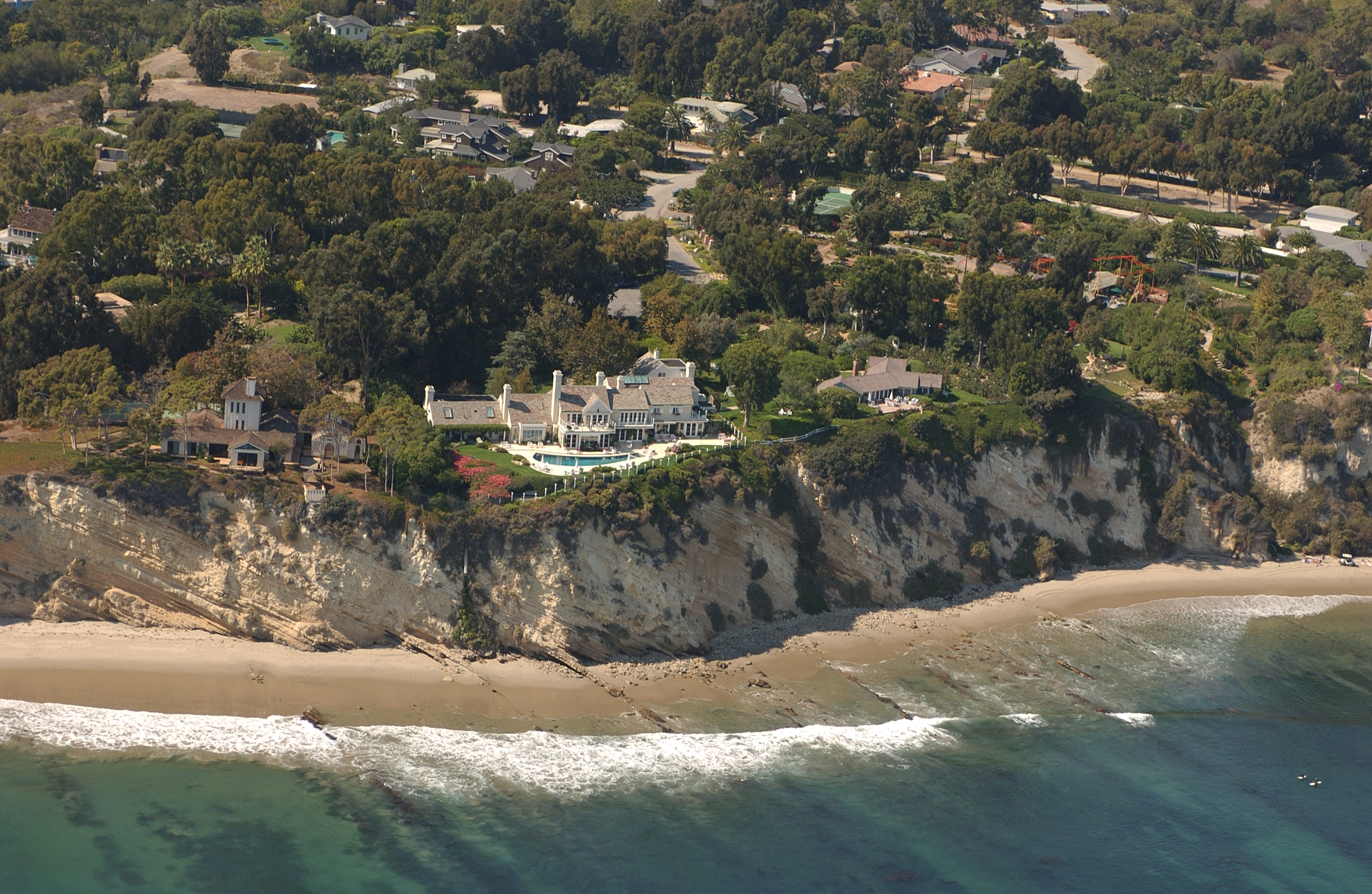
A typical image from the project, which gave rise to the "Streisand effect"

The California Coastal Records Project, founded in 2002, documents the California coastline with aerial photos taken from a helicopter flying parallel to the shore. Their webpage provides access to these images. One photo was taken every 500 feet (150 m). Each photo showed a few hundred yards of the coastline, with frames overlapping. The entire California coast is included, except sections of Vandenberg Air Force Base (although some historical photos are included from an earlier survey in 1989). Most of the coast has been photographed several times, and the website has an interface for comparing photos taken during different years.

The project was an expansion of a 1997 effort to document the environmental degradation at San Simeon Point, California.

== Kenneth and Gabrielle Adelman ==
Kenneth and Gabrielle Adelman were recipients of the 2004 Ansel Adams Award for Conservation Photography from the Sierra Club for their work on the project. The photographs were exhibited in 2003 at the Center for Land Use Interpretation, in a nearly ten-hour-long simulation of what they saw as they flew the length of the coast.

== Streisand effect ==
Kenneth Adelman, the creator of the project, was sued in 2003 by Barbra Streisand, who claimed that he had infringed upon her privacy by displaying a photograph of her Malibu home. The project countersued under the SLAPP provisions of California law and prevailed in court. (Note: The case was Streisand v. Adelman et al., in California Superior Court; Case SC077257) The lawsuit drew additional public attention to Streisand's home, giving name to the Streisand effect: the phenomenon in which attempting to hide or censor information instead draws greater attention to the information.

== Uses ==
Photos from this project have been used in scientific research, by news media, and by government agencies, as well as by individuals for their own enjoyment.

- 150 photos included in The California Coast from the Air (2014) by Gary Griggs and Deepika Shrestha Ross.
- Photos of Fort Funston near San Francisco were used by the U.S. Geological Survey (USGS) to test a method of calculating the amount of coastal erosion.
