= Rudolph Brasch =

Australian rabbi and author

Rudolph Brasch AM OBE (6 November 1912 – 13 November 2004) was an Australian rabbi and author.

== Biography ==
He was born in Berlin, Germany and moved to London when Hitler gained power in 1933. He eventually emigrated to Australia, arriving in 1949, and was the Chief Minister of the Temple Emanuel in Sydney for the next thirty years.

Among his honours were the Coronation Medal (1952), Officer of the Order of the British Empire (1967), the Silver Jubilee Medal (1977) and Member of the Order of Australia (1979).

He wrote several books, mostly focusing on customs and their origin.

He died on 13 November 2004, aged 92.

== Bibliography ==
Year	Title	Publisher	ISBN/EAN/ASIN
2005	The Book of Beginnings: A Miscellany of the Origins of Superstitions, Customs, Phrases and Sayings	ABC Books	0733315399
2001	A Bee in Your Bonnet?	Angus & Robertson	0207199949
1998	Reminiscences of a Roving Rabbi	Angus & Robertson	020718979X
1997	The Cat's Pyjamas	Angus & Robertson	0207189706
1996	Circles of Love	HarperCollins	0207185107
1995	A Book of Forgiveness	Angus & Robertson	0207188033
1994	A Book of Friendship	Angus & Robertson	0207183465
1994	The Book of Anniversaries: Loving Ways to Celebrate Your Marriage	Angus & Robertson	0207185093
1994	Christmas Customs & Traditions: Why We Do What We Do at Christmas	Angus & Robertson	020718609X
1994	That Takes the Cake	Angus & Robertson	0207185638
1993	A Book of Good Advice	Angus & Robertson	0207178429
1991	A Book of Comfort: To Help and Inspire in Troubled Times	Collins/Angus & Robertson	0207170940
1991	The Book of the Year: Special Days and Their Meanings	Angus & Robertson	0207166560
1989	Even More Permanent Addresses, Even More Australians Down Under	Collins Australia	0732224845
1987	Permanent Addresses: Australians Down Under	Collins Australia	0006371841
1987	Thank God I'm An Atheist: Religious Origins of Expressions, Customs and Institutions	Fontana Books	0006369189
1985	How did it Begin?	Collins	0732224608
1983	Mistakes, Misnomers, and Misconceptions	Fontana-Collins	0732224594
1982	There's a Reason for Everything	Fontana-Collins	0006363962
1977	Australian Jews of Today: And the Part They Have Played	Cassell	0726904481
1976	The Supernatural and You!	Cassell	0726904422
1973	How did Sex Begin?: The Sense and Nonsense of the Customs and Traditions That Have Separated Men and Women Since Adam and Eve	Angus & Robertson	0207127425
1971	How did Sports Begin?: A Look Into the Origins of Man at Play	Longmans	0582714125
1969	The Unknown Sanctuary: The Story of Judaism, its Teachings, Philosophy and Symbols	Angus & Robertson	0207951594
1969	Sir John Monash	Australian Historical Society	-
1967	Mexico: A Country of contrasts	Longmans	B0006BXV5Y
1958	The Eternal Flame	Angus & Robertson	B0007JGO1S
1955	The Star of David	Angus & Robertson	9780732259792
