= Brash Island =

Island in Antarctica

- Location of Brash Island

- Location in Antarctica

Geography
- Location: Antarctica
- Coordinates: 63°24′S 54°55′W
- Archipelago: Joinville Island group

Administration
- Administered under the Antarctic Treaty System

Demographics
- Population: Uninhabited

Brash Island is an isolated island lying 9.3 kilometres (5 nmi) northwest of Darwin Island, off the southeast end of Joinville Island. It was surveyed by the Falkland Islands Dependencies Survey in 1953, and so named by the UK Antarctic Place-Names Committee because the island lies in an area where there is a frequent occurrence of "brash ice" (an accumulation of floating ice made up of fragments not more than 2 m across).

== Important Bird Area ==
The island has been identified as a 63 ha Important Bird Area (IBA) by BirdLife International because it supports about 166,000 breeding pairs of pygoscelid penguins – probably mainly either Adélie or chinstrap penguins – based on a 2014 estimate from satellite imagery.

== See also ==
- List of Antarctic and sub-Antarctic islands
