= Gary Braasch =

Gary Braasch (1944 – March 7, 2016) was an American environmental photographer and writer focusing on nature and biodiversity across the globe. Braasch was born in Omaha, Nebraska, and made his home in Oregon.

== Work ==
Braasch photographed for over 40 years and was published by Time, Life, The New York Times Magazine, Discover, National Geographic, Nature, and many more. Braasch also won the 2006 Ansel Adams Award from the Sierra Club and the Outstanding Nature Photographer citation from the North American Nature Photography Association. He died at the age of 72 while snorkeling at the Great Barrier Reef on March 7, 2016.

=== Publications ===
Braasch's work has been published many times involving environmental awareness across several magazines and publishers.

- Antarctic Seabird Research (International Wildlife)
- Great Smoky Mountains National Park Biodiversity (Audubon)
- The Threat of Oil Drilling in Alaska's Arctic (BBC Wildlife)
- Tropical Forest Studies in Peru (The Nature Conservancy)
- Anaconda Research in Venezuela (Smithsonian)
- Honeybees and Native Pollinators (Natural History)
- Endangered Wood Stork Nesting in the Everglades (Audubon)
- Rare Plant Rescue in Hawaii (Smithsonian and Discover)
- Climate Change in Florida and Alaska (Natural Resources Defense Council)
- Earth under Fire: How Global Warming Is Changing the World with Bill McKibben (2009, University of California Press. ISBN 978-0520260252)
