= C.C. Lockwood =

C. C. Lockwood is a nature and wildlife photographer specializing in Louisiana and the Gulf Region, including the Yucatan Peninsula. He has received the Sierra Club’s Ansel Adams Award for Conservation Photography. He is also the co-founder of several environmental organizations, including the Baton Rouge Audubon Society, The Clean Team and Marsh Mission.

== Biography ==
"C.C. Lockwood was born in Kansas City, Missouri, in 1949 and grew up in Fort Smith, Arkansas, where he graduated from Southside High School. He moved to Louisiana in 1967 to attend Louisiana State University, where he received his B.S. in Finance in 1971. During his early years in Louisiana he fell in love with the state’s swampy backcountry, and he abandoned plans for a career in business as soon as he graduated. He taught himself photography and headed for wild places, determined to make a living capturing images of nature. Much of this time has been on a houseboat. He has been married to Sue Richardson since 1996.

He is currently working on a book entitled Sustainable AG and editing and digitalizing his early work. His photographs are held in many personal, museum, and corporate collections. Most recently, he was honored as a "Louisiana Legend" by Louisiana Public Broadcasting, "Conservation Communicator of the Year" by the Louisiana Wildlife Federation, and a Distinguished Alumni by LSU. He continues to row white water rivers of the west and explore the wetlands of Louisiana.

== Books ==
- Atchafalaya, America’s Largest River Basin Swamp, 137 color photographs and text, 1981
- The Gulf Coast: Where Land Meets Sea, 160 color photographs and text, LSU Press, 1984
- Discovering Louisiana, 155 color photographs and text, LSU Press, 1986
- The Yucatán Peninsula, 142 color photographs and text, LSU Press, 1989
- C.C. Lockwood’s Louisiana Nature Guide, 246 color photographs and text, LSU Press, 1995
- Beneath the Rim: A Photographic Journey Through the Grand Canyon, 137 color photographs and text, LSU Press, 1996
- Around the Bend, A Mississippi River Adventure, 158 color photographs and text, LSU Press, 1998
- Still Waters, Images, 1971-1999, 100 color photographs and text, LSU Press, 2000
- The Alligator Book, 144 color photographs and text, LSU Press, 2002
- Mike the Tiger, the Roar of LSU, color photographs by Lockwood and text by Bivet and Baker, LSU Press, 2003
- Marshmission, Capturing the Vanishing Wetlands, 100 color illustrations and text by Lockwood and Rhea Gary, LSU Press, 2005
- Atchafalaya Houseboat, photographs by Lockwood, text by Gwen Roland, LSU Press, 2006
- CC Lockwood's Atchafalaya, color photographs and text by CC Lockwood, LSU Press. 2007
- Louisiana Wild, The Protected and Restored Lands of the Nature Conservancy, color photographs and text by CC Lockwood, LSU Press 2015

== Publications ==
- National Geographic – September 1979, “Atchafalaya”
- National Geographic – June 1980, “Neshoba County Fair”
- National Geographic – August 1983, “Mississippi Delta”
- Smithsonian – April 1998, “The Yucatán’s Flooded Basement”

== Films ==
- Atchafalaya, America’s Largest River Basin Swamp, filmed, written and directed by Lockwood, 1977

== Accolades ==
- Honored as Forum35 Art Melt Louisiana Art Legend, 2012
- Louisiana State University Alumni Association Hall of Distinction, 2006
- Conservation Communicator of the Year, Louisiana Wildlife Federation, 2005
- Louisiana Legend Award, Louisiana Public Broadcasting, 2000
- The Gulf Coast – American Library Association Notable Book, 1984
- Atchafalaya – Louisiana Literary Award for Book of the Year, 1981
- Baton Rouge Young Man of the Year, 1981
