= Charles Brasher =

Canadian inventor

Charles E Brasher was a Canadian inventor, and maker of stringed instruments. His inventions include a novel cone for the resonator guitar, which he patented in Canada in 1935, under Canadian patent #349662.

== History ==
Charles E. Brasher was a metalworker who made resonator instruments in Toronto, Ontario, Canada in the early to mid 1930s. He created and patented a resonator cone of his own design.

When the patent was issued he was a chauffeur.(His patent application describes him as 'Chauffeur') He had impressed some wealthy Torontonian somehow, and the wealthy Torontonian used Ted as his full-time chauffeur for a few years. Later on, during the World War II time frame Ted worked for Research Enterprises, and then Inglis Home Appliances, as a machinist, tool and die maker, and lathe operator.

It is thought that Charles only made the metalwork and that the necks and wooden bodies were made by other persons. One example is an Aloha cover plate on a wooden Reliance body which had "J. E. BACKSTROM 257 BERKELEY S TORONTO." Stamped inside the body, i.e. it was stamped there before the wood was glued up. Another maker whose work is evident in the wooden body instruments is Arthur Hensel, also of Toronto, Ontario, Canada to whom I credit most of the wooden bodies and necks.

There are six known models made by Charles.

- The Maui.(All metal body, with engraved resonator cover plate and body.)
- The Aloha.(Wood body, with engraved metal resonator cover plate.)
- The Supertone.(All metal body, with engraved resonator cover plate, un-engraved body.)
- The Silvatone. (All metal body, with engraved resonator cover plate, engraved body.)
- The Reliance. (Wood body, with un-engraved metal resonator cover plate.)
- The Artist. (Wood body, with un-engraved metal resonator cover plate.)

== See also ==
- Dobro
