= Artificial fly =

Lure used in fly fishing

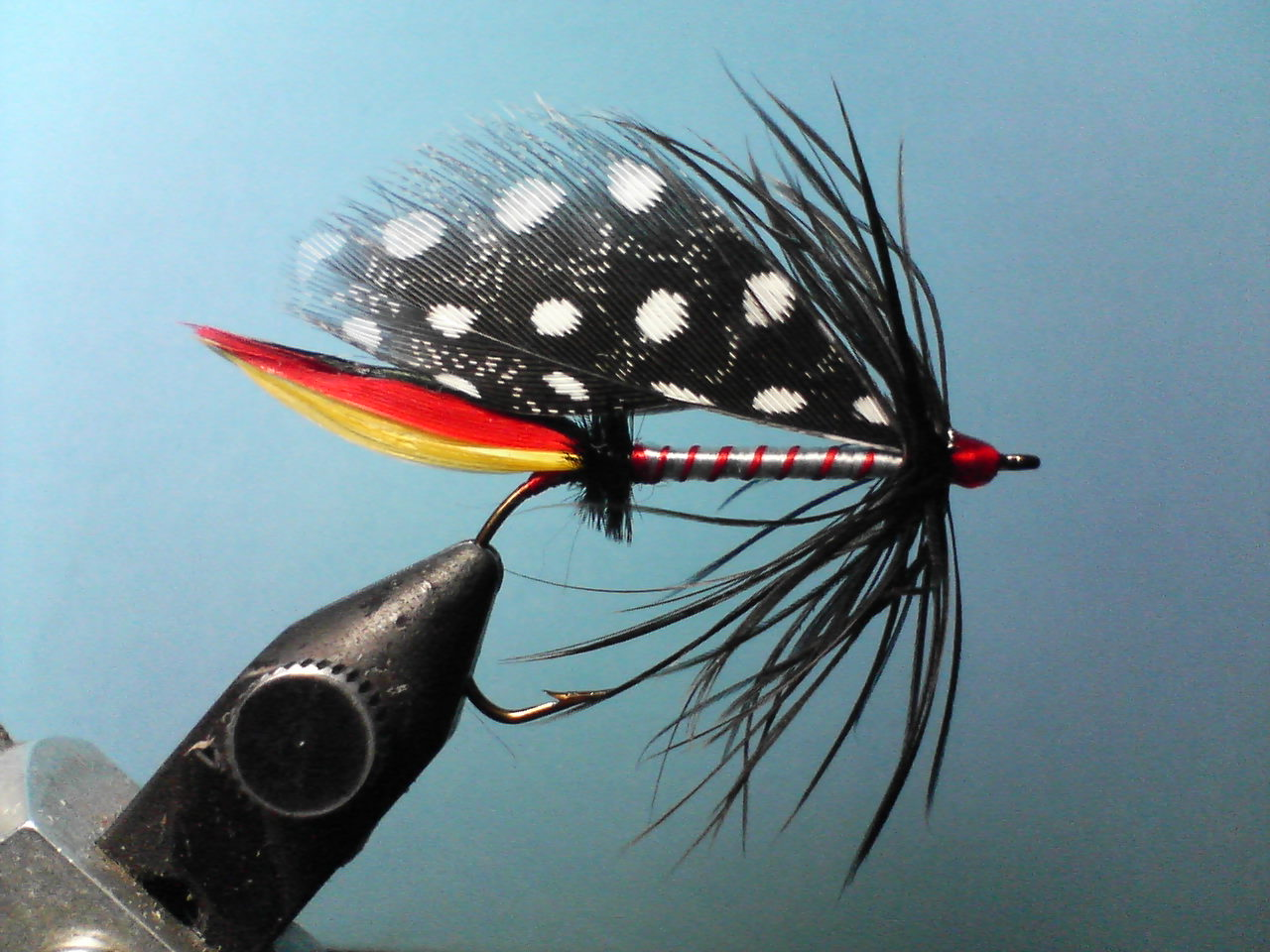
Classic 19th-century artificial fly – The Triumph

An artificial fly or fly lure is a type of ultralight fishing lure typically used in the sport of fly fishing, although they may also be used in other forms of angling. In general, artificial flies are primarily designed to imitate the types of flying and aquatic insects that are the natural food of the game fish species the fly fishermen try to target. Artificial flies are made by fly tying, in which filamentous materials such as fur/hairs, feathers, synthetic fibers and yarns are wound and tied directly onto a plain fish hook, creating loose tufts/bundles of bristles that aesthetically resemble the setae, venation, spines and other invertebrate appendages.

Artificial flies may be made to resemble all manner of natural preys to freshwater and saltwater fish, including insects (both aquatic and terrestrial) and nymphs, small crustaceans (e.g, shrimps and scuds), worms (microdriles and leeches), and even small aquatic vertebrates (baitfish, fry and tadpoles). There are thousands of artificial fly patterns, many of them with descriptive and often idiosyncratic names, and the most effective artificial fly patterns are said to be killing flies because of their ability to put fish in the creel for the fly fishermen.

Due to their very light weight (little more than the weight of the hook itself) and high drag, artificial flies typically cannot be cast far as an independent terminal tackle using ordinary angling gears and techniques, and thus require specialized fly fishing tackles. These include a heavy-ended fishing line known as a fly line, which provide the extra mass needed to launch the fly; and a slow-action fishing rod known as a fly rod. During fly casting, it is not uncommon to see fly fishermen slinging the line back-and-forth repeatedly in loops to gradually build up momentum before finally launching it forwards.

== Construction ==
Fly tying is a common practice in fly fishing, considered by many anglers an important part of the fly fishing experience. Many fly fishers tie their own flies, either following patterns in books, natural insect examples, or using their own imagination. The technique involves attaching small pieces of feathers, animal fur, and other materials onto a hook in order to make it attractive to fish. This is made by wrapping thread tightly around the hook and tying on the desired materials. A fly is sized by the size hook it is tied on. The construction of tube flies is different in that the tier secures materials to a tube rather than to a hook. These flies are rigged by passing the fishing line through the tube before attaching a hook.

== Types ==
Generally, fly patterns are considered either "imitations" or "attractors". These can be further broken down into nymphs, terrestrials, dry flies, eggs, scuds, and streamers. Imitations seek to deceive fish through the lifelike imitation of insects on which the fish may feed. Imitations do not always have to be precisely realistic in appearance; they may derive their lifelike qualities when their fur or feathers are immersed in water and allowed to move in the current. Attractors, which are often brightly colored, seek to draw a strike by arousing an aggression response in the fish. Famous attractors are the Stimulator and Royal Wulff flies.

== History ==
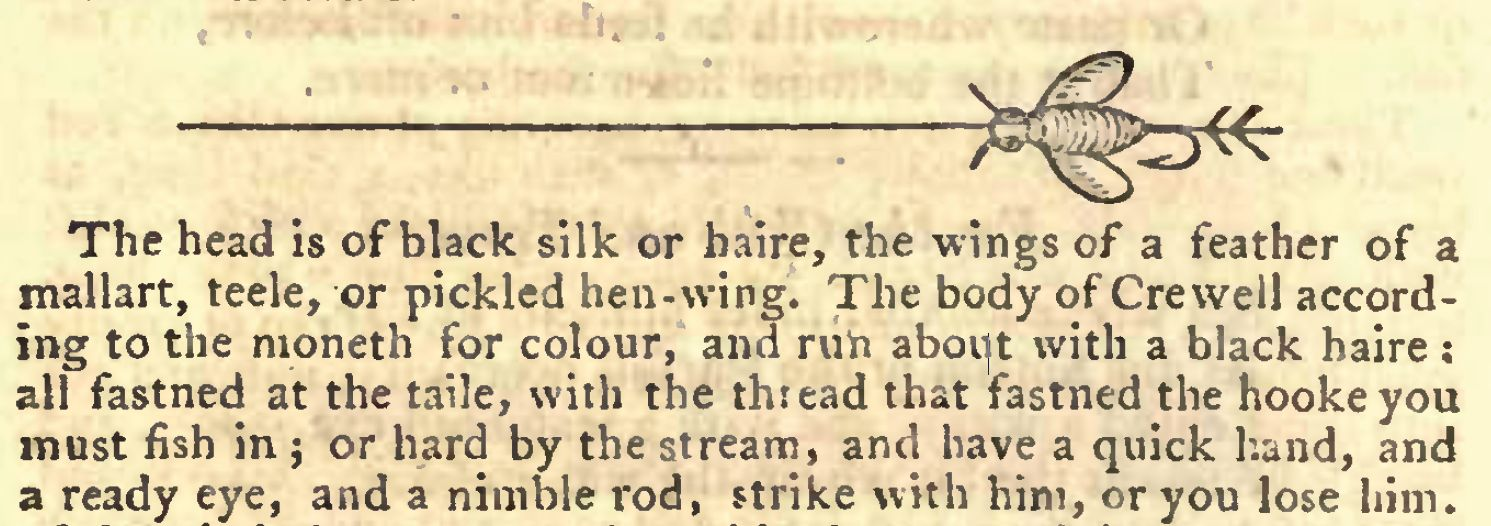
First known illustration of a fishing fly from 4th. edition (1652) of John Dennys's The Secrets of Angling, first published in 1613, probably the earliest poetical English treatise on Angling.,

The first literary reference to flies and fishing with flies was in Ælian's Natural History probably written about 200 A.D. That work discussed a Macedonian fly. The Treatyse on Fysshynge with an Angle was published (1496) within The Boke of St. Albans attributed to Dame Juliana Berners. The book contains, along with instructions on rod, line and hook making, dressings for different flies to use at different times of the year. Probably the first use of the term Artificial fly came in Izaac Walton's The Compleat Angler (1653),

Oh my good Master, this morning walk has been spent to my great pleasure and wonder: but I pray, when shall I have your direction how to make Artificial flyes, like to those that the Trout loves best?

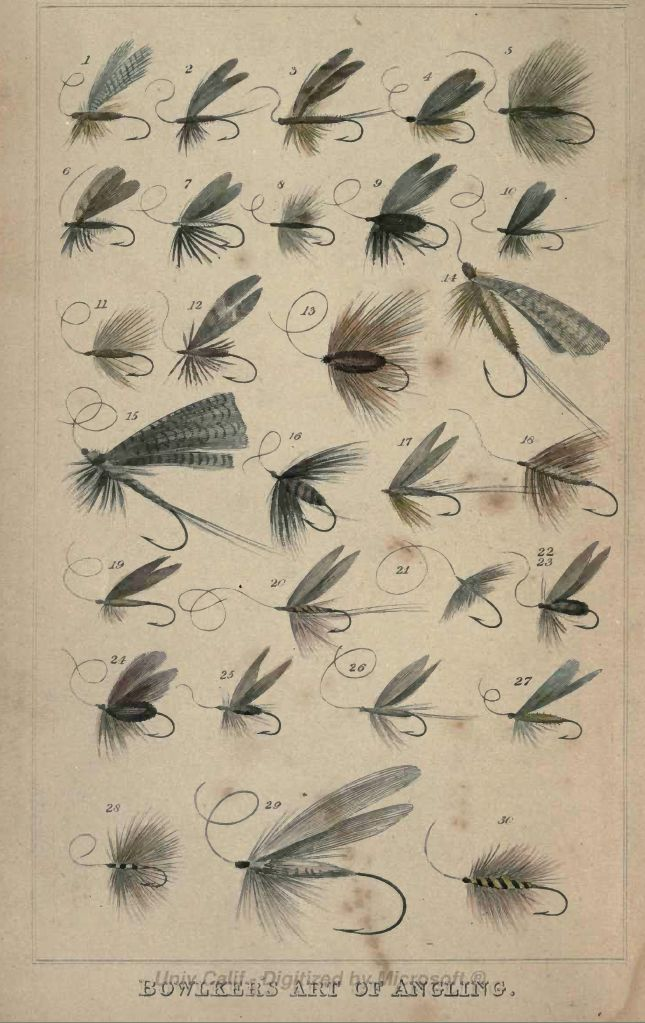
Frontispiece from Bowlker's Art of Angling (1854) showing a variety of artificial flies

The 1652 4th edition of John Dennys's The Secrets of Angling, first published in 1613, contains the first known illustration of an artificial fly.

By the early 19th century, the term artificial fly was being routinely used in angling literature much like this representative quote from Thomas Best's A Concise Treatise on the Art of Angling (1807) to refer to all types of flies used by fly fishers.

The art of artificial fly-fishing, certainly has the pre-eminence over the other various methods that are used to take fishes in the art of angling.

Although the term fly was a reference to an imitation of some flying insect, by the mid-19th century the term fly was being applied to a far greater range of imitation.

The term fly is applied by sea fishermen to a certain arrangement of feathers, wax, etc., which I am about to describe the manufacture of, and which may be used with considerable success in mackerel, basse, and pollack fishing. I am not disposed to think, however, that such baits are ever mistaken by the fish which they are intended to capture for flies; but the number used, the way in which they are mounted, viz., several on one trace, and the method of their progress through the water, rather leads me to the belief that they are mistaken for a number of small fry, and treated accordingly.

=== Imitation ===
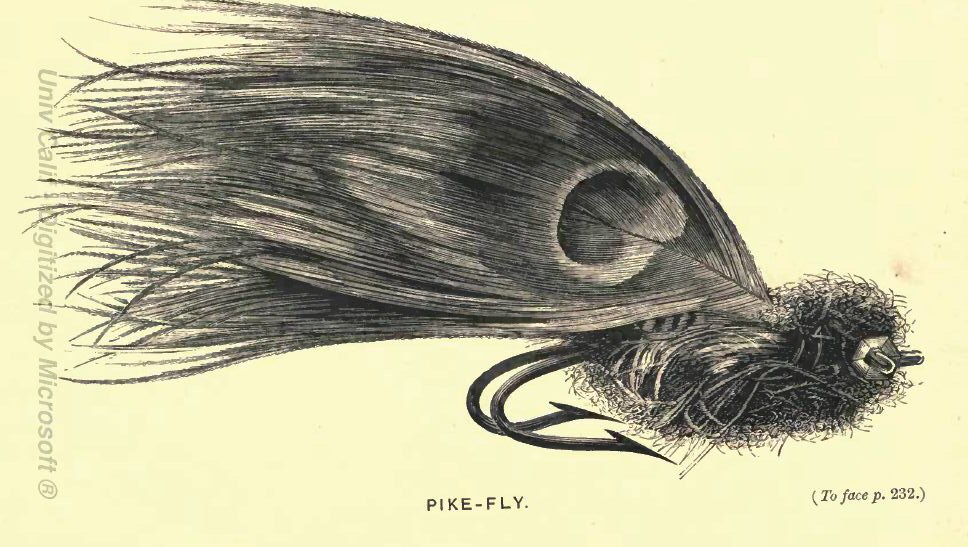
Illustration of a large Pike fly (1865)

A major concept in the sport of fly fishing is that the fly imitates some form of fish prey when presented to the fish by the angler. As aquatic insects such as mayflies, caddisflies and stoneflies were the primary prey being imitated during the early developmental years of fly fishing, there were always differing schools of thought on how closely a fly needed to imitate the fish's prey.

In the mid to late 19th century, those schools of thought, at least for trout fishing were: the formalists (imitation matters) and the colourists (color matters most). Today, some flies are called attractor patterns because in theory, they do not resemble any specific prey, but instead attract strikes from fish. For instance, Charles Jardine, in his 2008 book Flies, Ties and Techniques, speaks of imitators and attractors, categorizing the Royal Wulff as an attractor and the Elk Hair Caddis as an imitator, whereas "... in sea trout and steelhead fishing there is a combination of imitation and attraction involved in fly construction". Paul Schullery in American Fly Fishing – A History (1996) explains however that although much has been written about the imitation theories of fly design, all successful fly patterns must imitate something to the fish, and even a perfect imitation attracts strikes from fish. The huge range of fly patterns documented today for all sorts of target species-trout, salmon, bass and panfish, pike, saltwater, tropical exotics, etc. are not easily categorized as merely imitative, attractors or something else.

=== Fly names ===
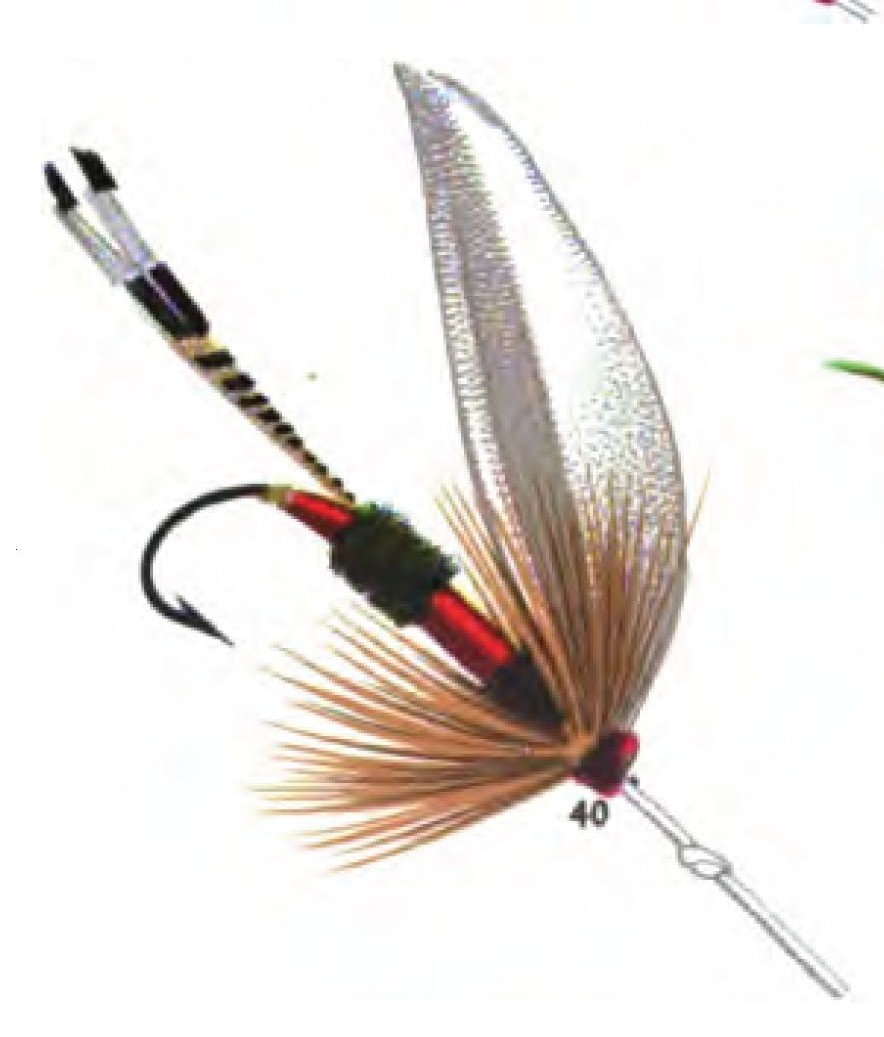
Orvis Royal Coachman

There is no convention or consistency in the naming of artificial flies. Long-standing popular patterns have names that have persisted over time. However, fly designers and amateur or professional fly tyers are free to create any fly they choose and to give it any name they want. Angling writers, the popular angling press, and professional fly tackle dealers have always introduced new patterns with new names. The only naming convention is that there is no convention. Flies have been named to honor or celebrate fellow anglers: Royal Wulff, Jock Scott, Quill Gordon, Adams; named to describe their color and composition: Ginger Quill, Gold-ribbed Hare's Ear, Partridge and Orange; named to reflect some regional origin: Bow River Bugger, Tellico nymph, San Juan worm; named to reflect the prey they represent: Golden stone, Blue-wing Olive, Pale Morning Dun, Elk Hair Caddis, White swimming shrimp; named to reflect nothing in particular: Woolly Bugger, Club Sandwich; and, more often than not, named to evoke the designer: Copper John nymph (John Barr), Clouser Deep Minnow (Bob Clouser), Crazy Charlie (Charlie Smith), Brooks' Montana stone (Charles Brooks), Parks' Salmonfly (Merton Parks), Carey Special (Colonel Carey), Dahlberg Diver (Larry Dahlberg) or Dave's Hopper (Dave Whitlock).

The well-known trout fly Coachman was originated by Tom Bosworth, who drove Queen Victoria's coach The Royal Coachman was first made by John Haily, a professional fly dresser living in New York City. In writing of other matters, he enclosed this fly for us to see, saying "A gentleman wanted me to tie up some Coachman for him to take to the north woods and to make them extra strong, so I have tied them with a little band of silk in the middle to prevent the peacock bodies from fraying out. I have also added a tail of the barred feathers of the wood-duck, and I think it makes a very handsome fly." A few evenings later, a circle of us were together "disputing the fly in question", one of the party claiming that numbers were "quite as suitable to designate the flies as so many nonsensical names". The others did not agree with him, but he said: "What can you do? Here is a fly intended to be a Coachman; but it is not the true Coachman; it is quite unlike it and what can you call it?" Mr. L. C. Orvis, brother of Mr. Charles Orvis, who was present said: "Oh that is easy enough; call it the Royal Coachman it is so finely dressed!" And this name in time came to be known and used by all who are familiar with the fly. When Lee Wulff first designed the Royal Wulff, based on contemporary Catskill patterns, he'd intended to name it "Bucktail Coachman," referencing the bucktail wings he'd added for better flotation. Fellow fisherman and conservationist Dan Bailey insisted that he call them "Wulffs" and began tying them under that name.

== Contemporary fly types ==
The categorization of artificial flies has evolved considerably in the last 200 years as writers, fly tiers and fishing equipment retailers expound and promote new ideas and techniques. Additionally, as the popularity of fly fishing expanded globally to new and exotic target species, new flies and genera of flies came into being. There are many subtypes in some of these categories especially as they apply to trout flies. As well, any given pattern of artificial fly might well fit into multiple categories depending on its intended use. The following categorization with illustrative examples is derived from the following major artificial fly merchants offerings.

- Orvis – An American fly fishing retailer in business since 1856 and is headquartered in Sunderland, Vermont
- Farlows of London – A British fly fishing retailer in business since 1840
- TheFlyStop – An online fly merchant since 2004 in San Diego, California
- The Essential Fly an online merchant in Yorkshire since 2006 home of famous fly tyers like Oliver Edwards and home of Northern Spider trout flies Selby, Yorkshire
- Umpqua Feather Merchants – An American artificial fly manufacturer and wholesaler in business since 1972 and is headquartered in Louisville, Colorado

=== Dry flies ===
Dry flies are designed to be buoyant or land softly on the surface of the water, typically to imitate the form of a terrestrial insect that accidentally falls into the water. Dry flies are generally considered freshwater flies.

Dry flies
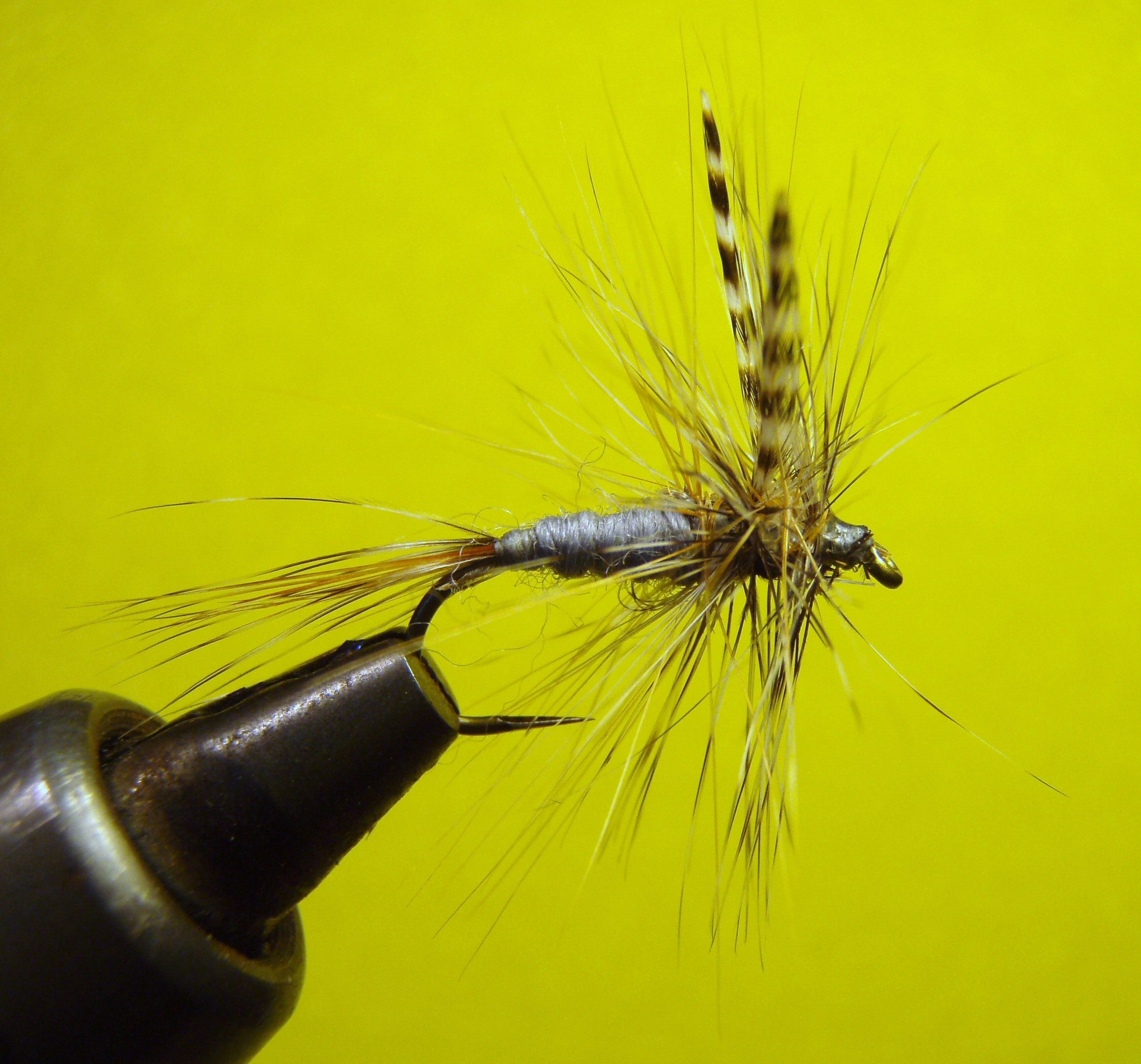
The Adams – A typical dry fly

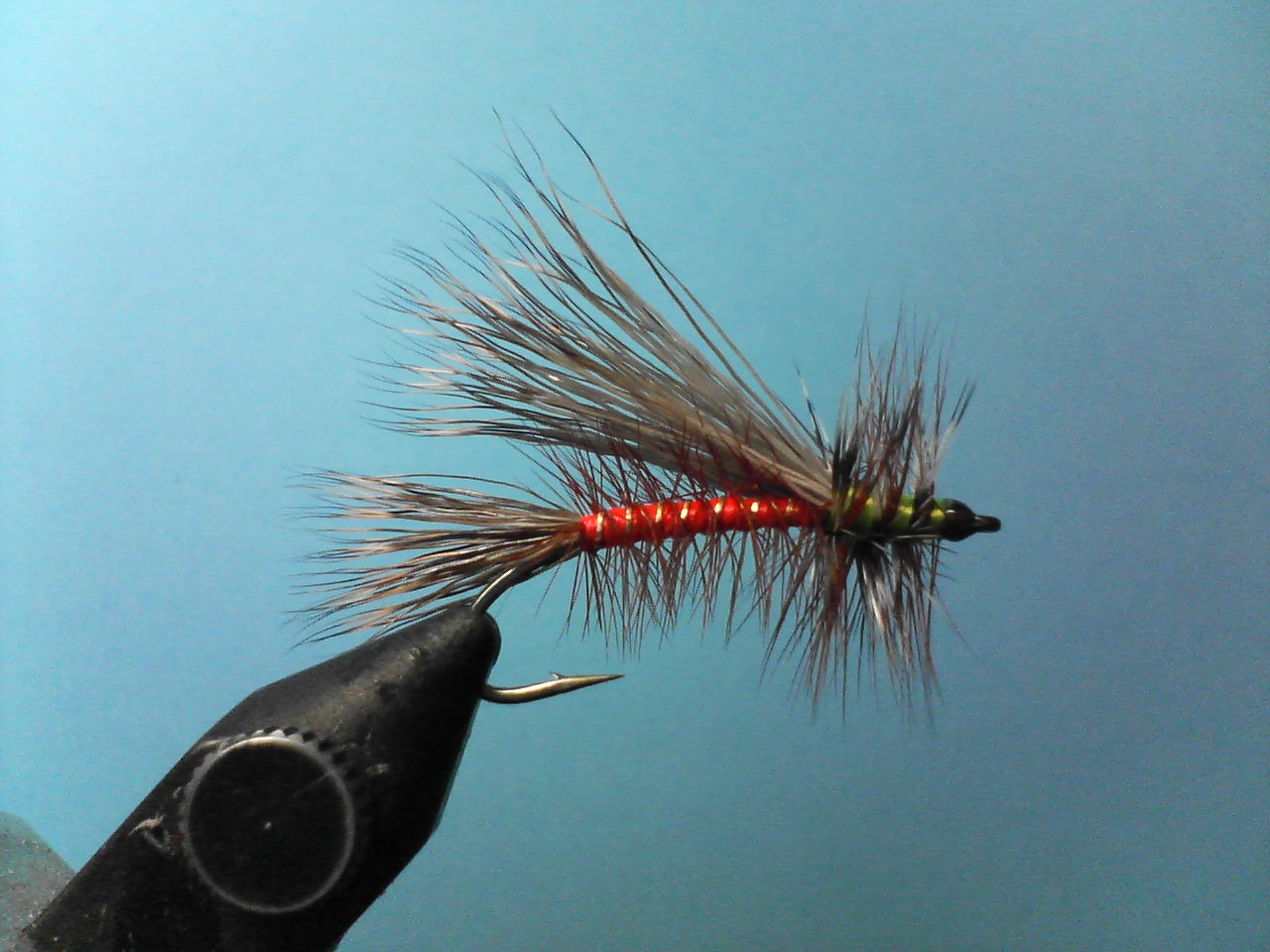
Orange Stimulator – A caddisfly, grasshopper, or stonefly imitation

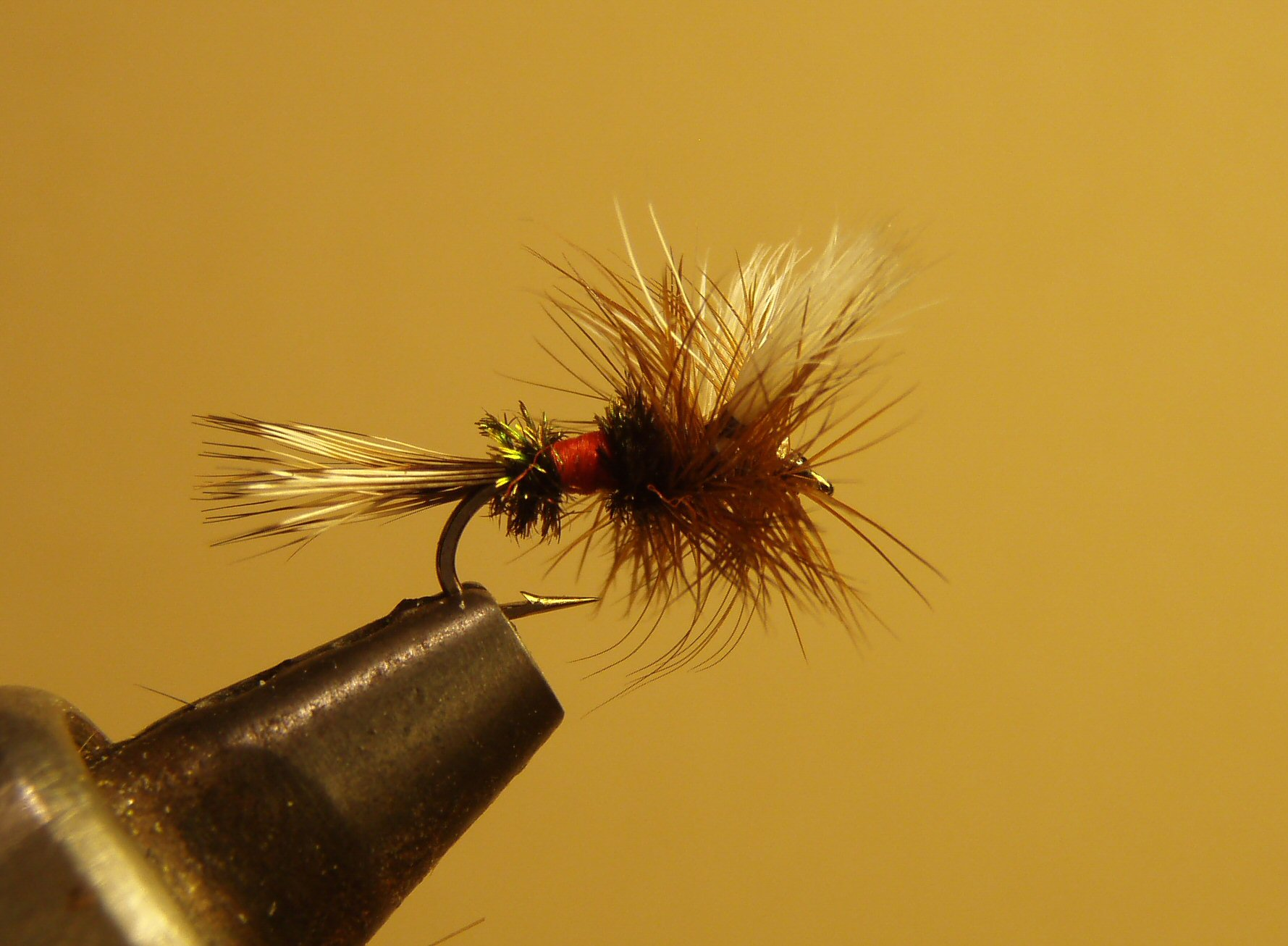
Royal Wulff – A classic attractor pattern

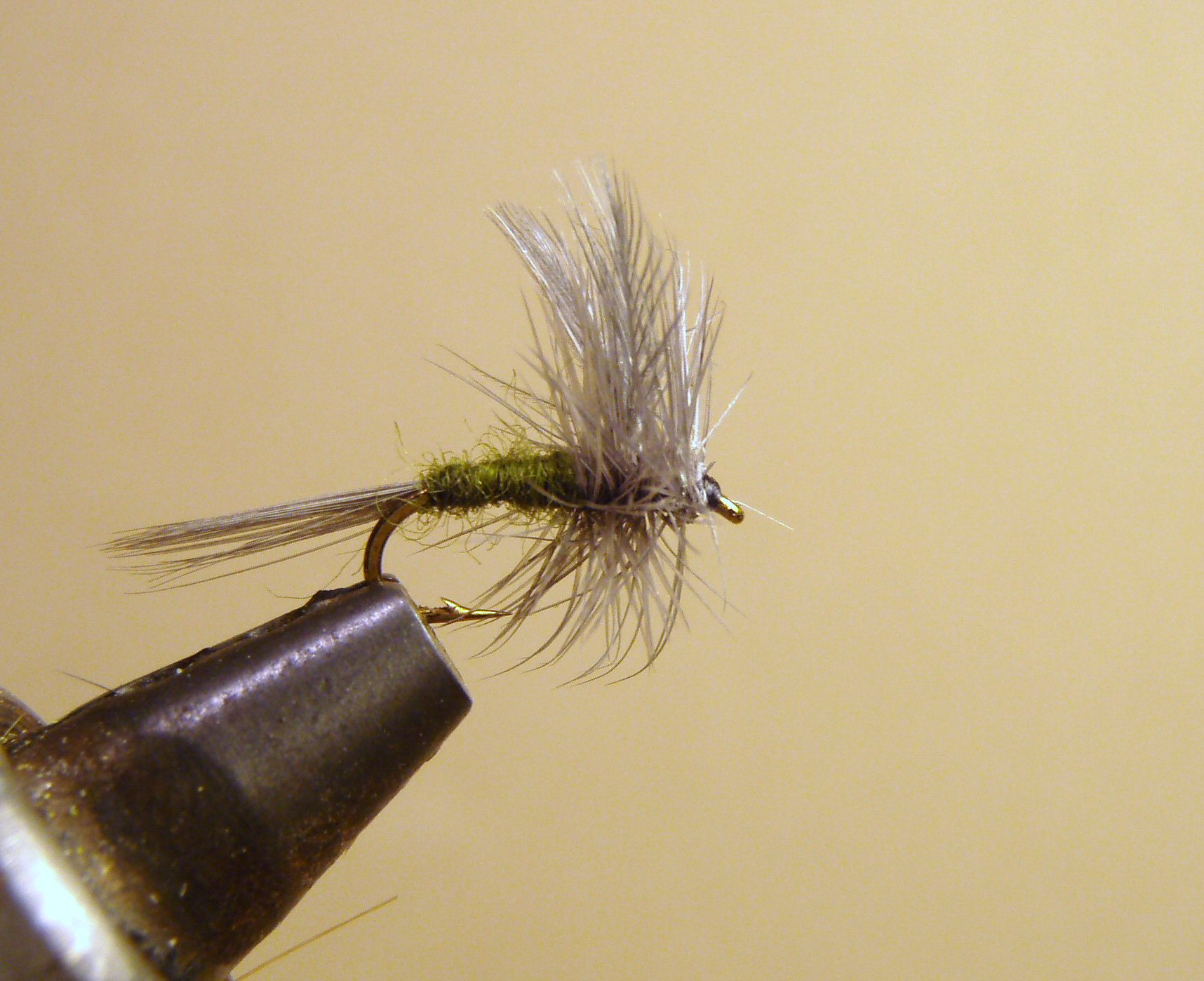
Blue-Winged Olive dry fly (BWO)

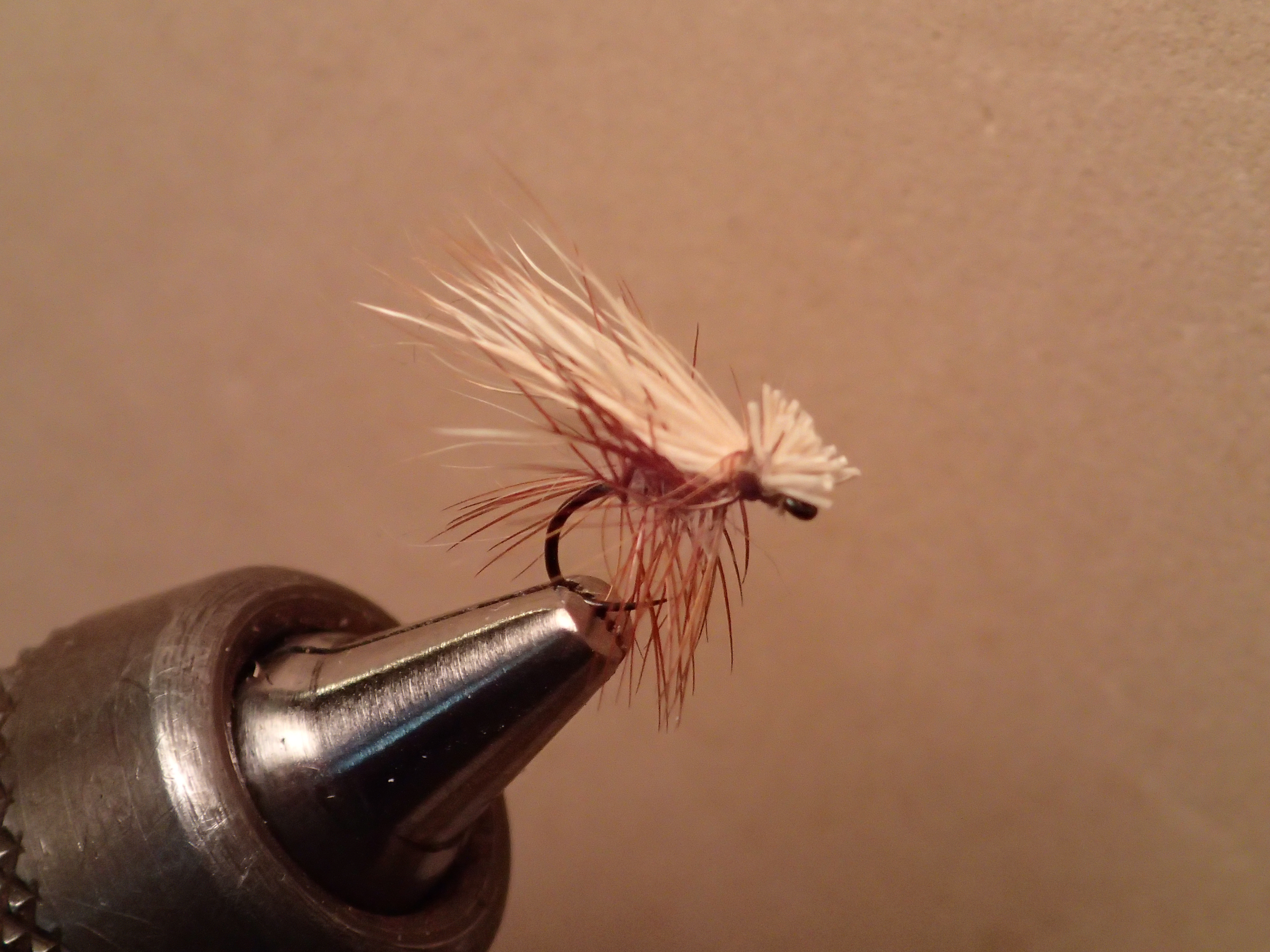
Elk Hair Caddis dry fly

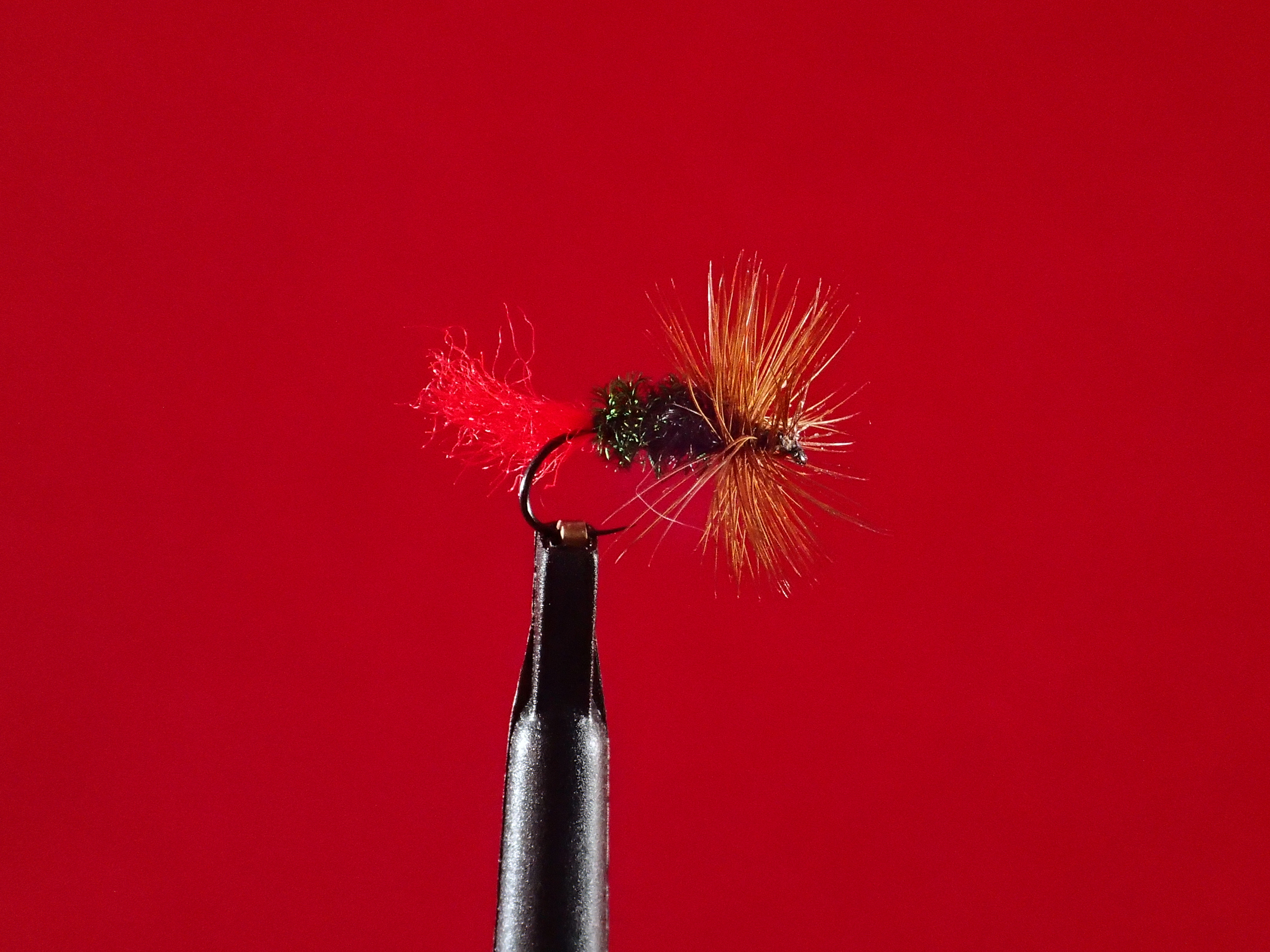
Tasmanian Red tag, a gum beetle imitation

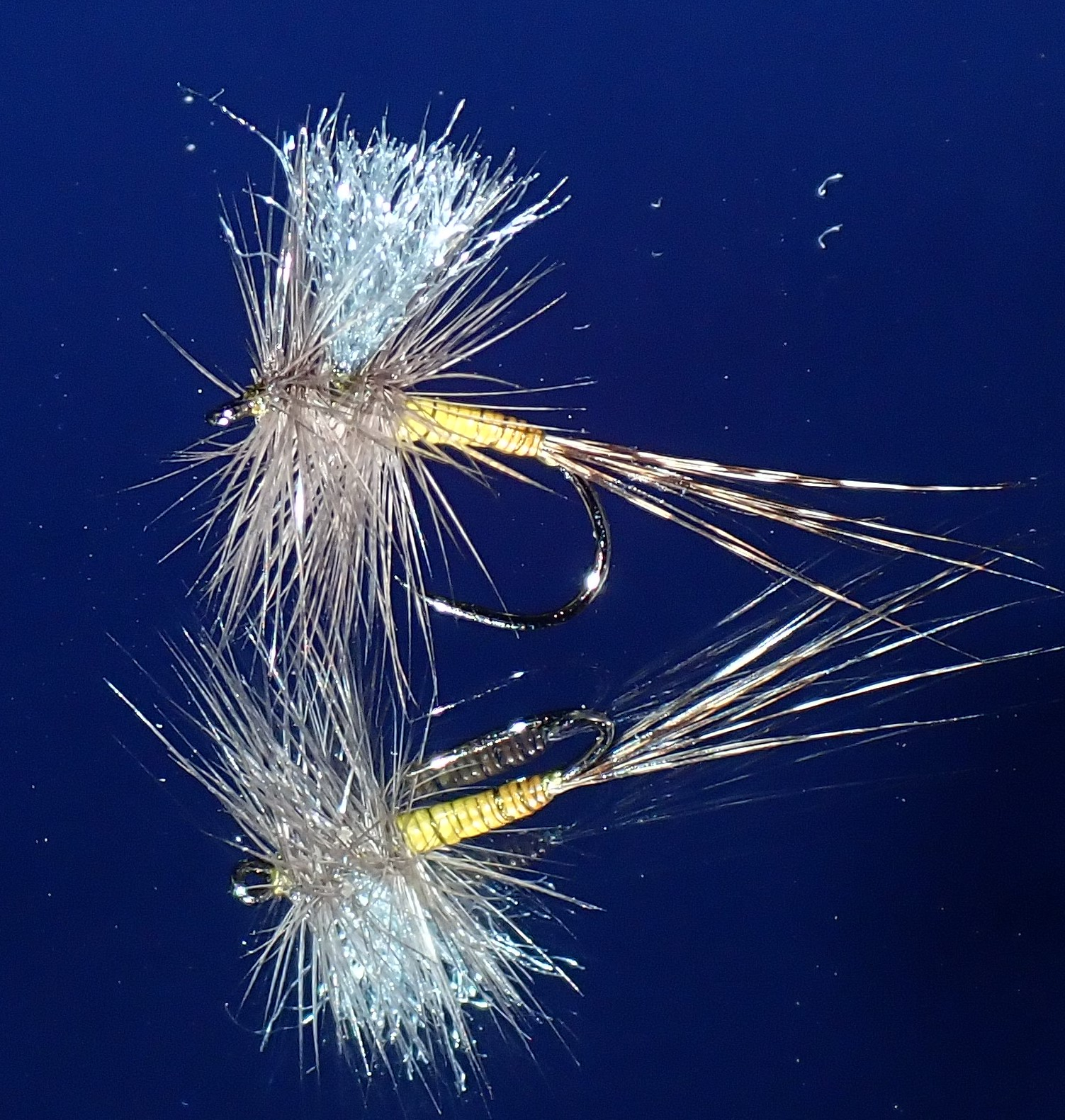
Blue-winged Olive Quill (BWO)

=== Wet flies ===
Wet flies are designed to sink below the surface of the water, and are tied in a wide variety of patterns to represent aquatic insect and its fully aquatic larvae, pupae and nymph forms, drowned and sunken terrestrial insects, freshwater shrimps, small baitfish and other underwater prey. Wet flies are generally considered freshwater flies.

Wet flies
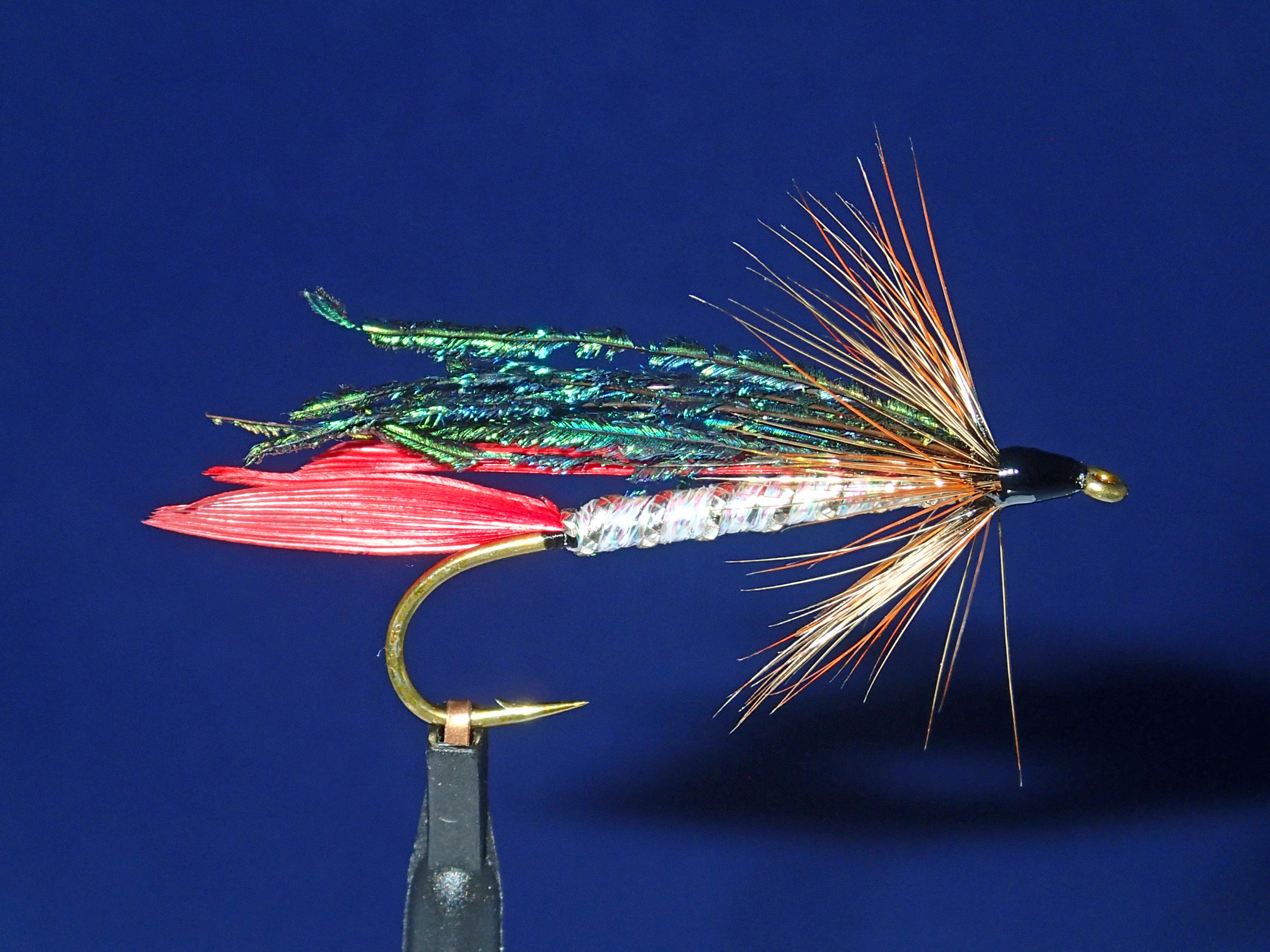
The Alexandra is a classic British lake fly

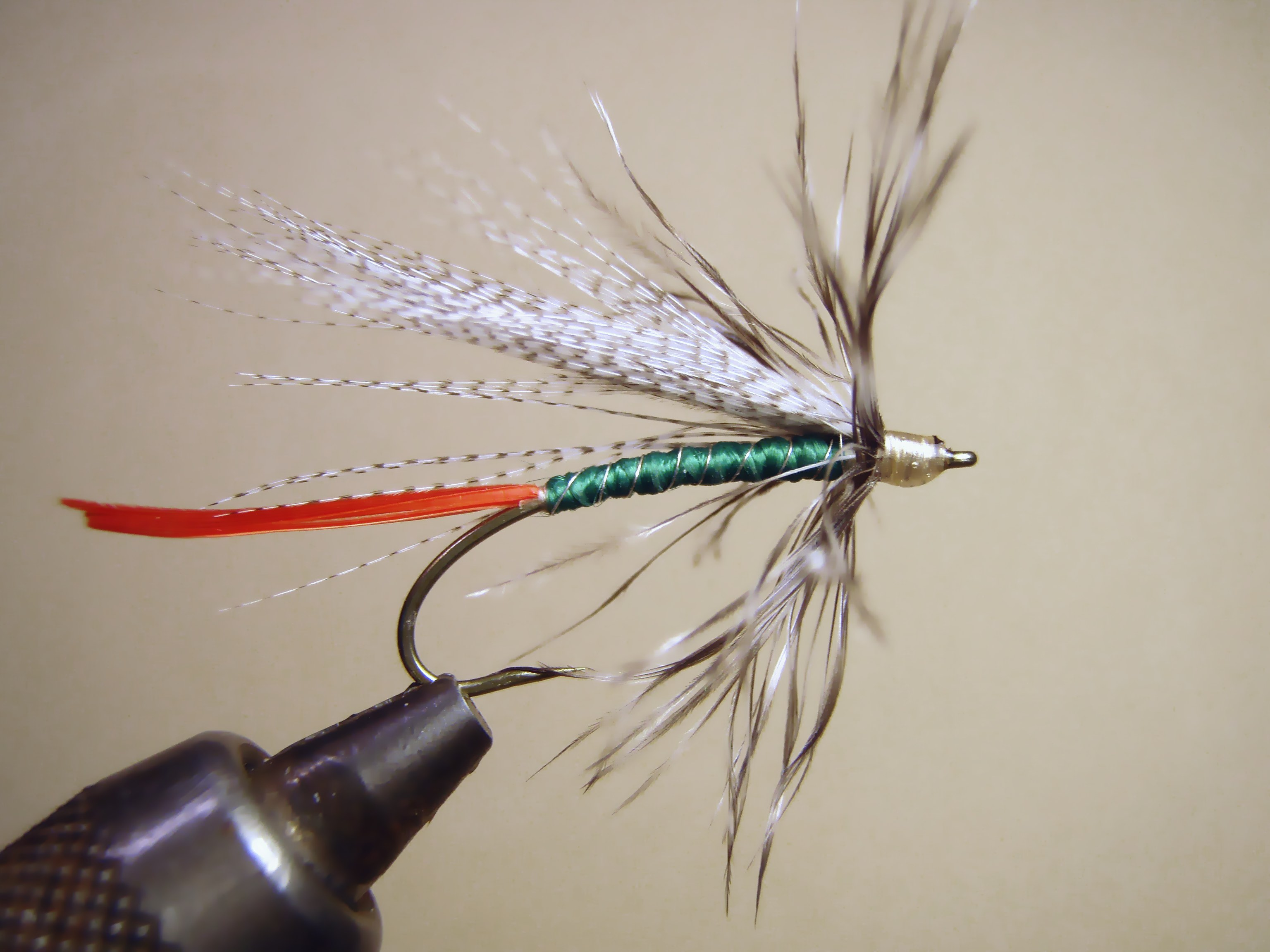
Grizzly King – A classic wet fly

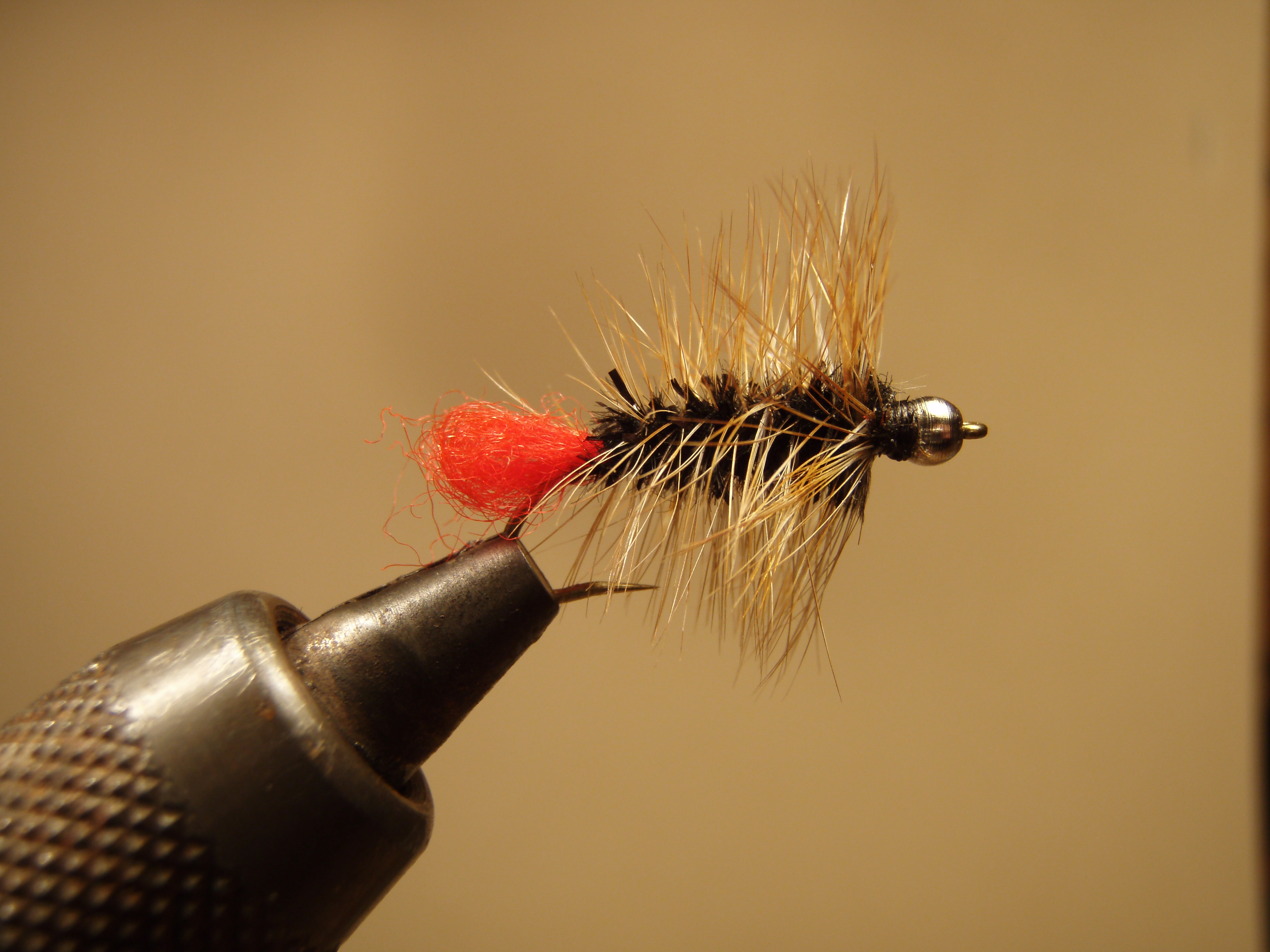
A Woolly Worm wet fly

Professor wet fly

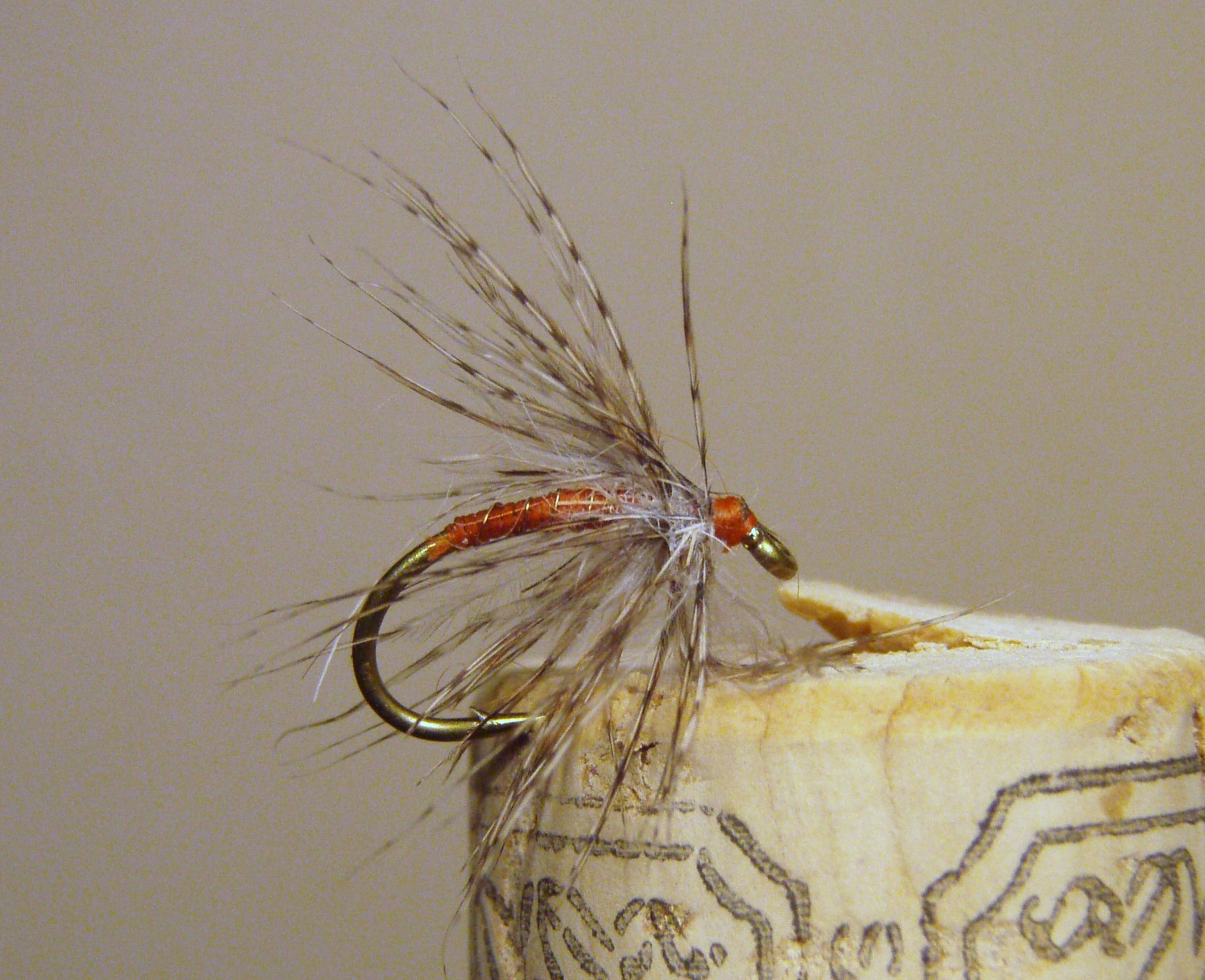
Partridge and Orange soft-hackle

=== Nymph flies ===
Nymphs are designed to resemble the immature (nymph) form of aquatic insects and small crustaceans. Nymph flies are generally considered freshwater flies.

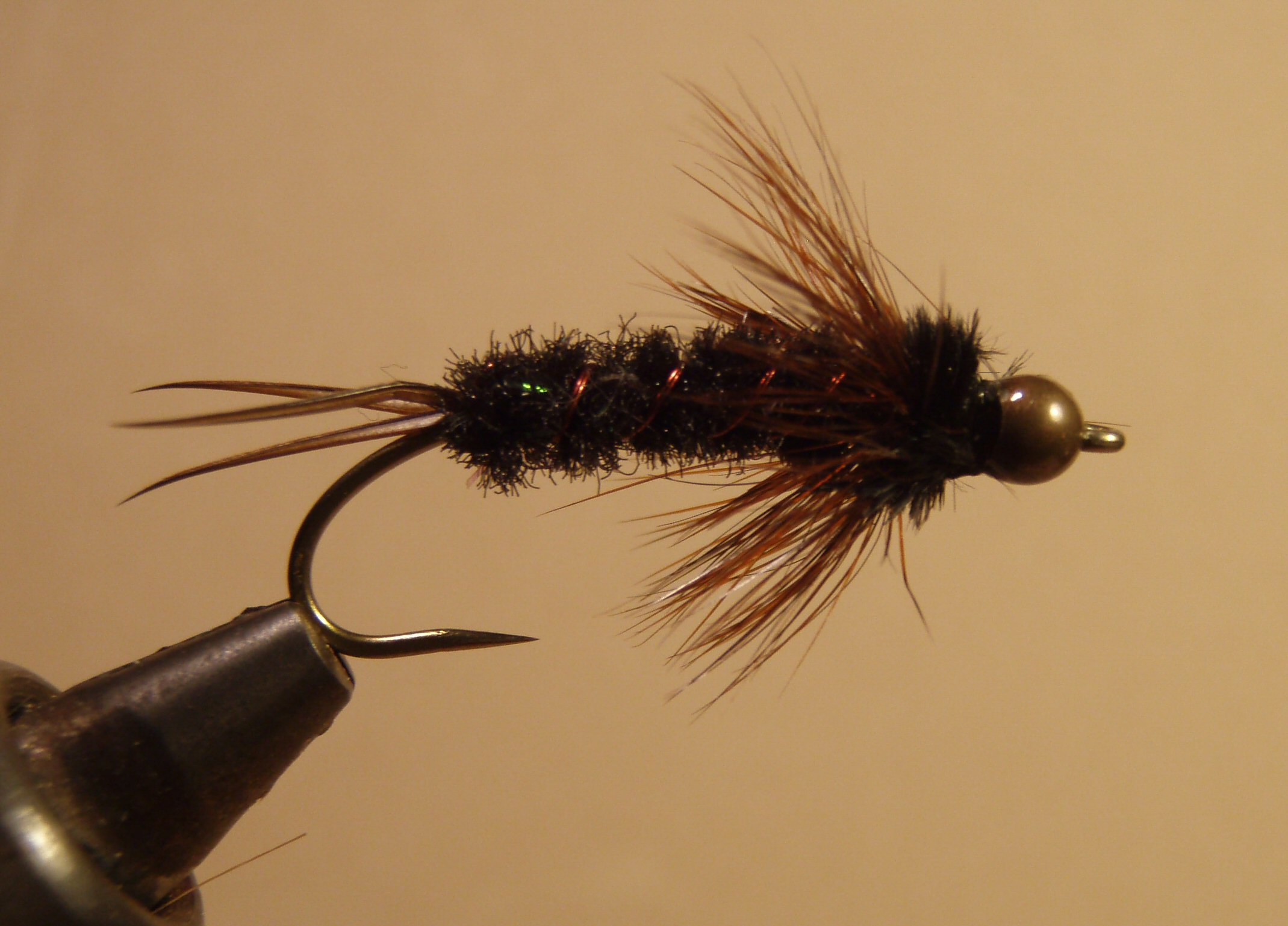
Brook's Montana Stonefly nymph

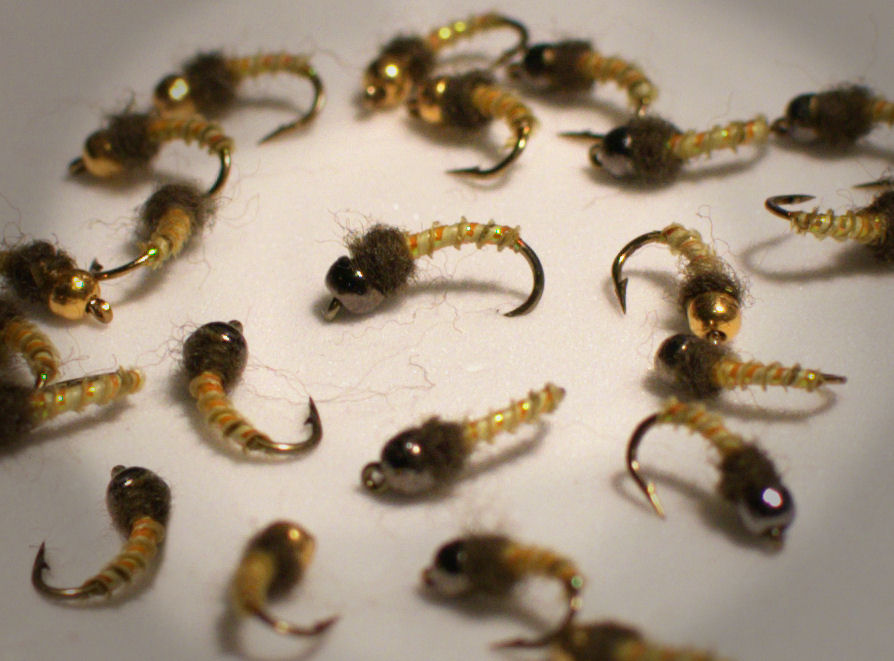
Biot midge larvae

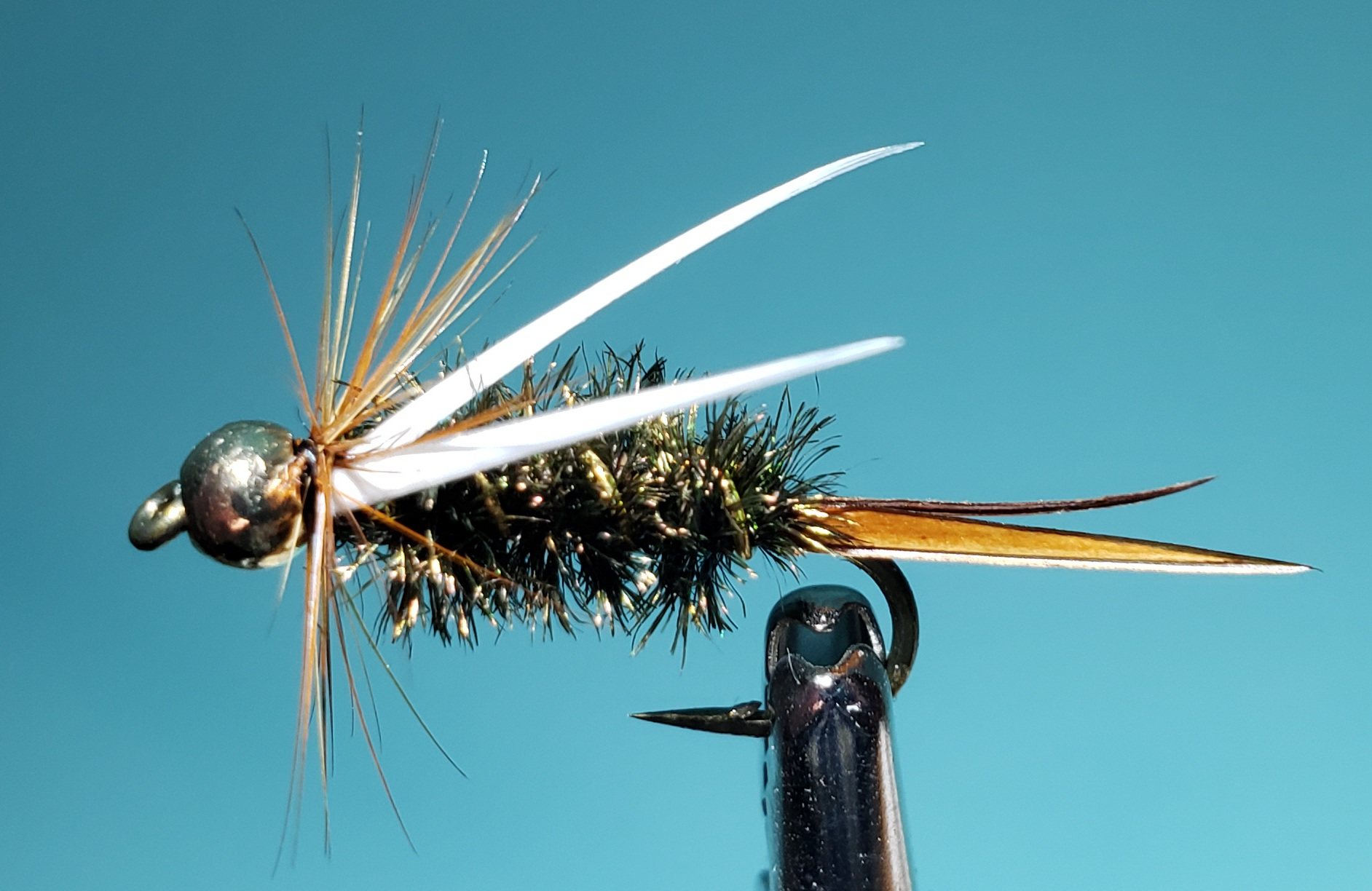
Bead Head Prince Nymph

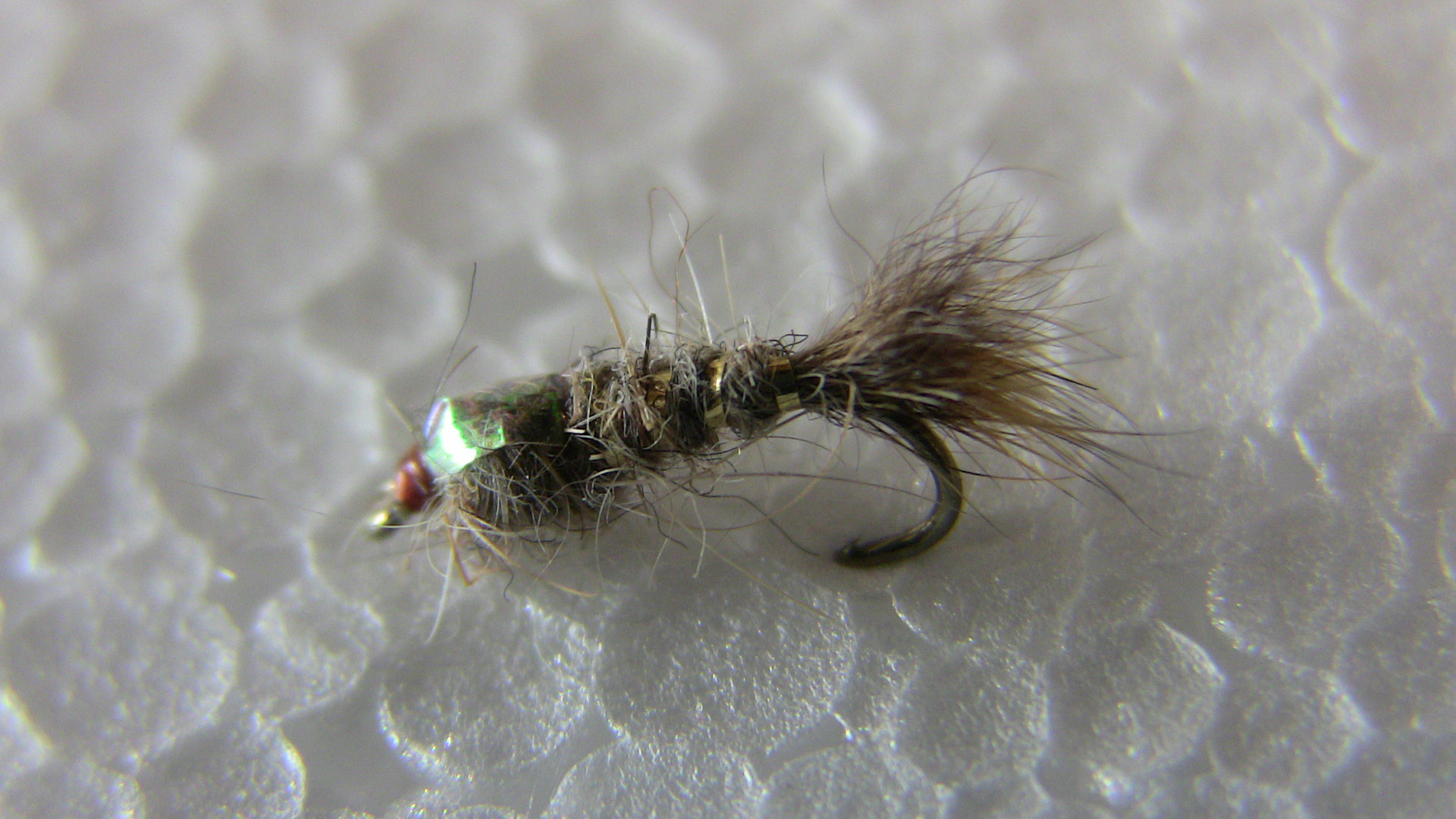
Gold Ribbed Hairs Ear Nymph

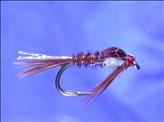
Pheasant Tail Nymph

=== Emerger flies ===
Emergers are designed to resemble the not-yet-mature form of an aquatic insect as it leaving the water to moult and become an adult. Emergers are generally considered freshwater trout flies.

=== Streamer flies ===
Streamers are designed to resemble the nektonic forms of baitfish, tadpoles or other larger aquatic/semi-aquatic prey such as crayfish, newts and water snake harchlings. Streamer flies may be patterned after both freshwater and saltwater prey species. Streamer flies are a very large and diverse category of flies as streamers are effective for almost any type of gamefish.

Streamer flies
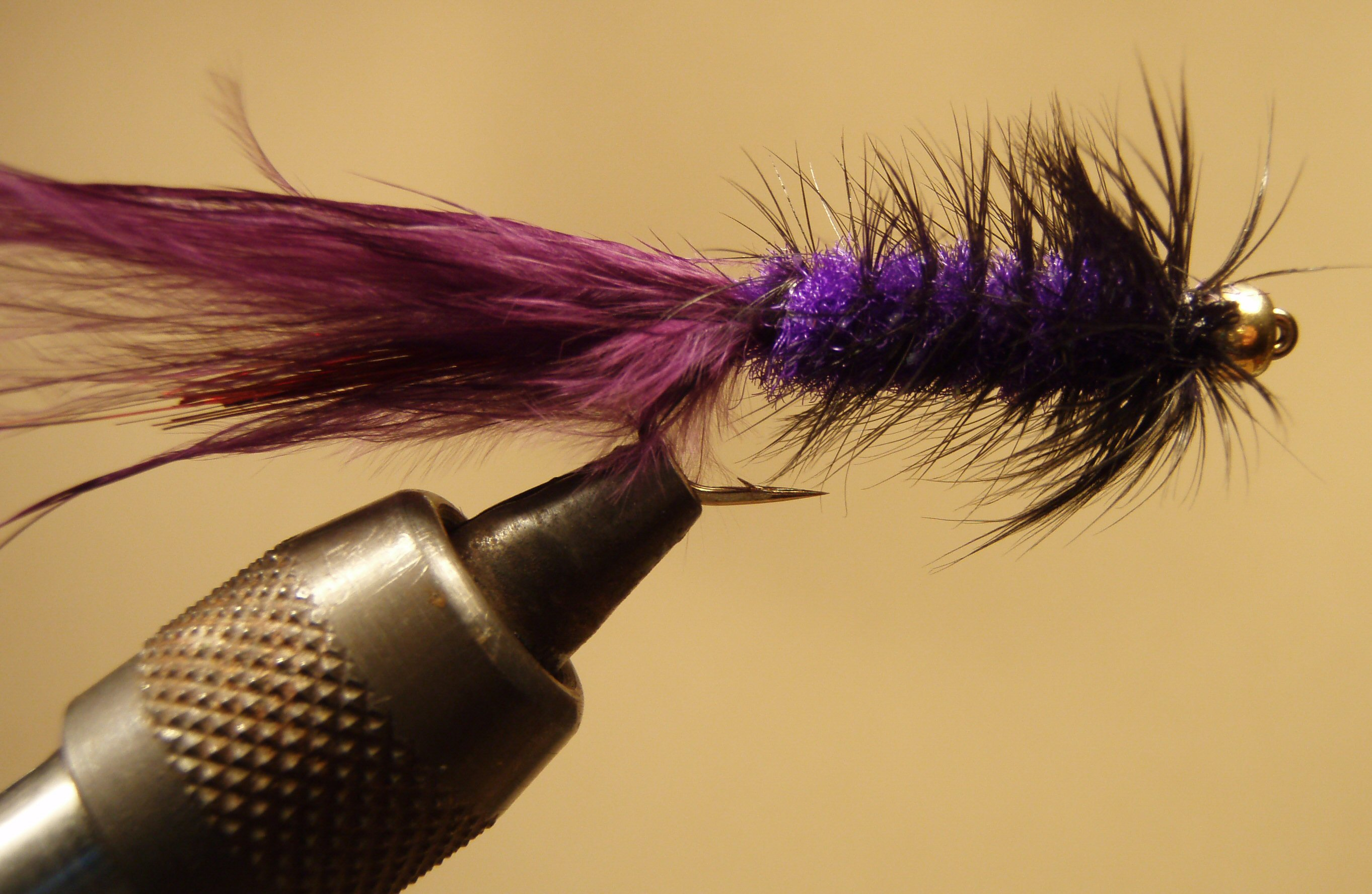
Woolly Bugger – A universal streamer pattern

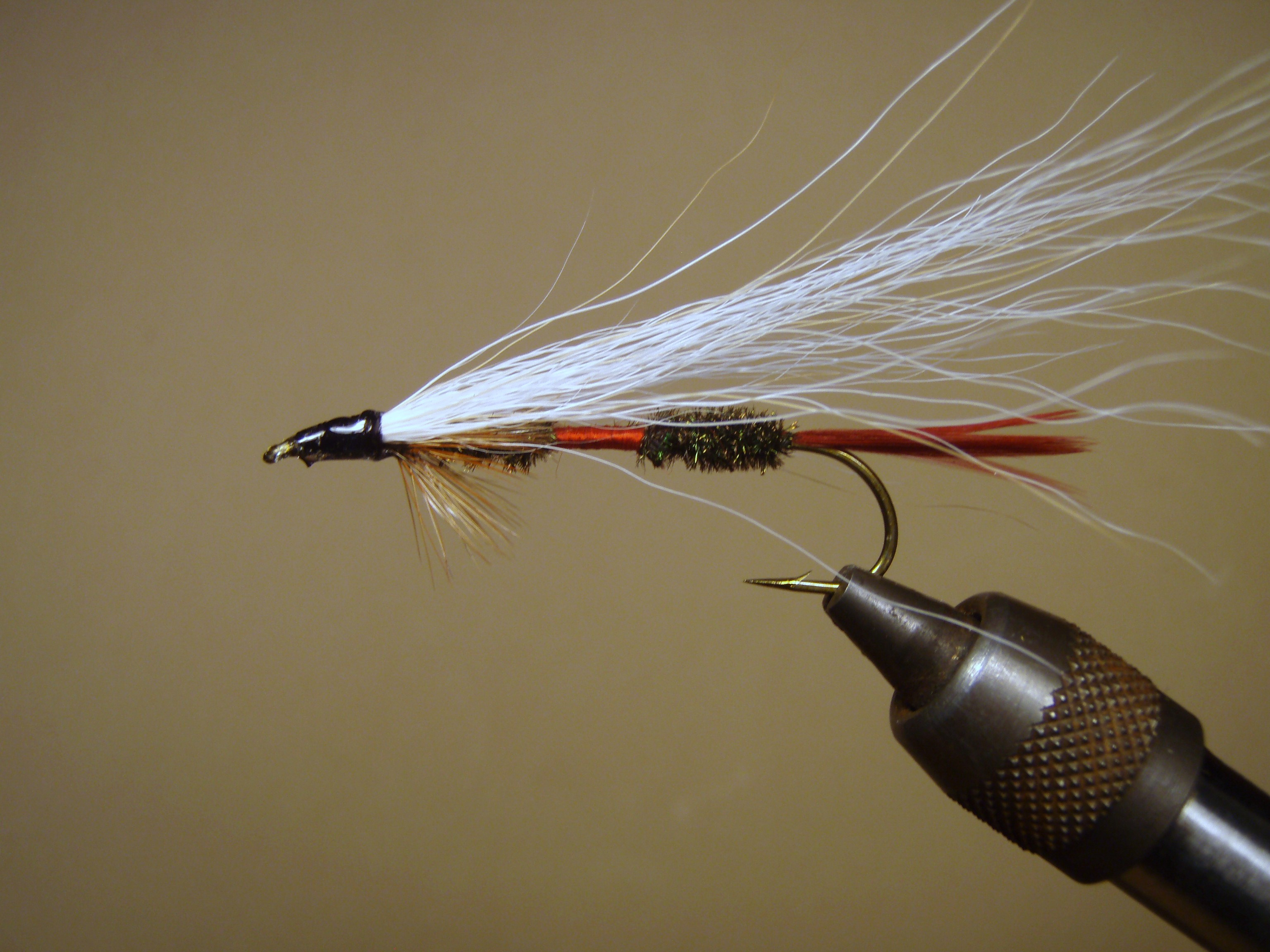
Royal Coachman Bucktail

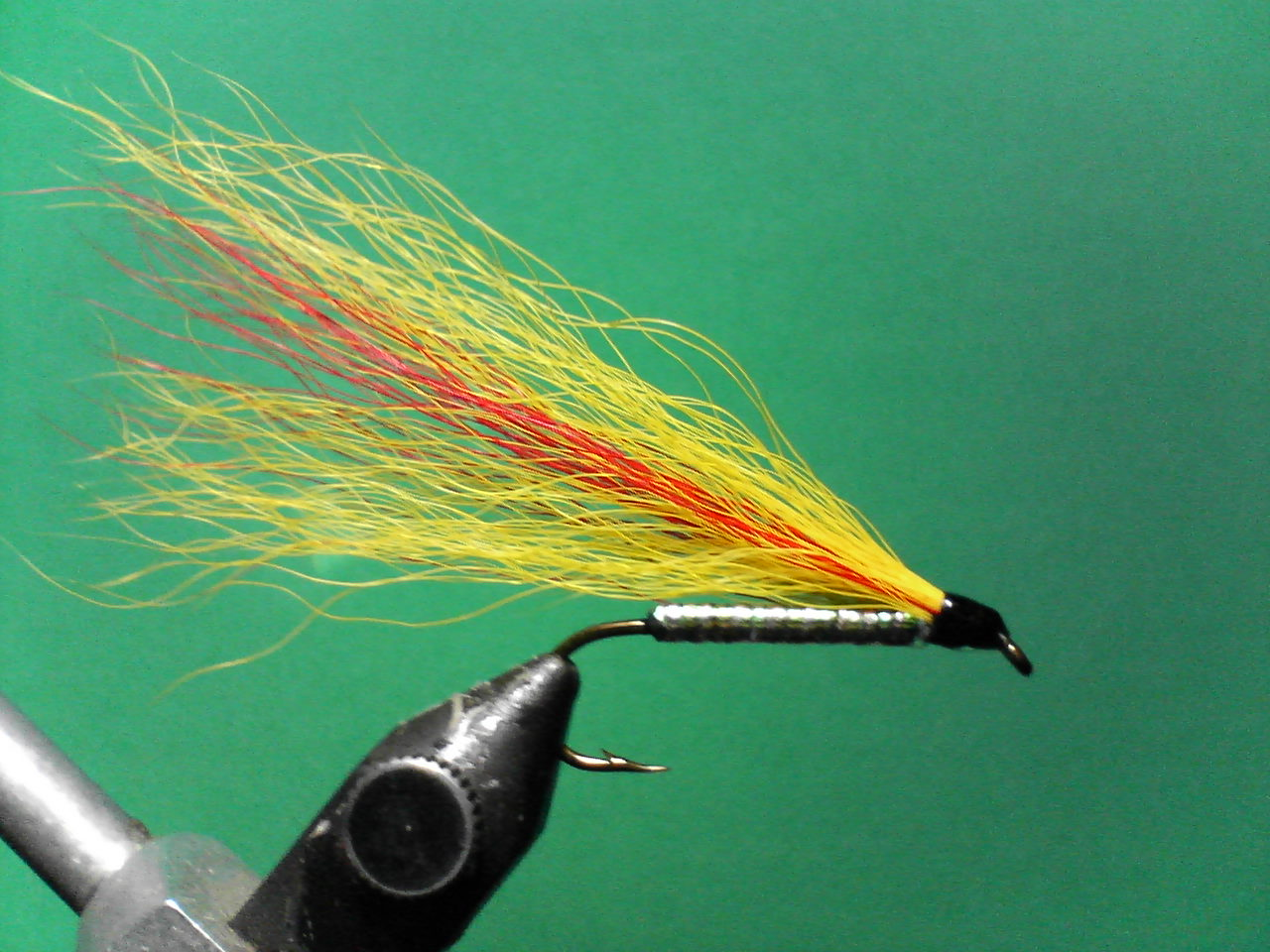
Mickey Finn – A classic streamer pattern

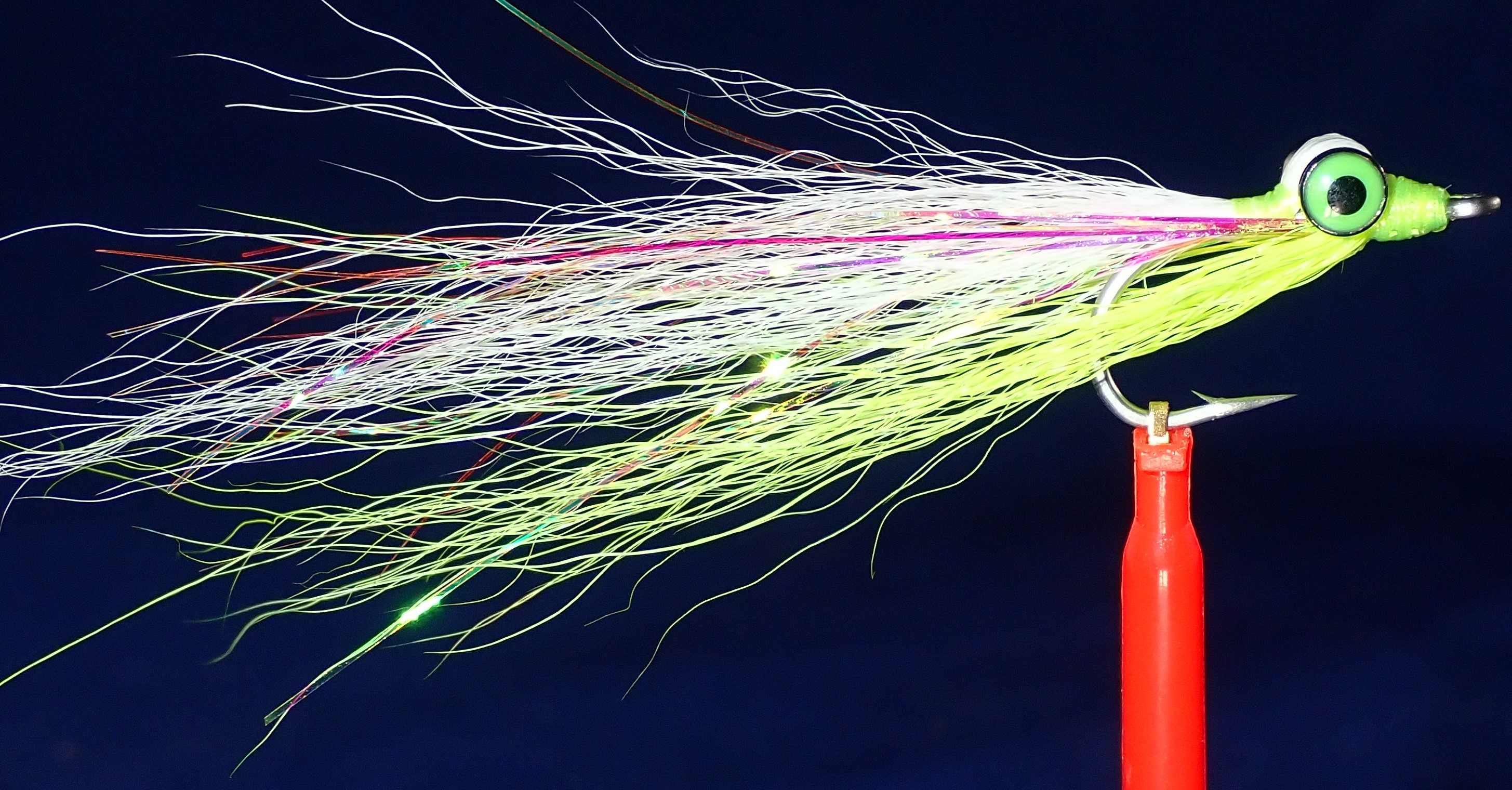
Clouser Deep Minnow – A popular streamer pattern used for both fresh and saltwater fishing
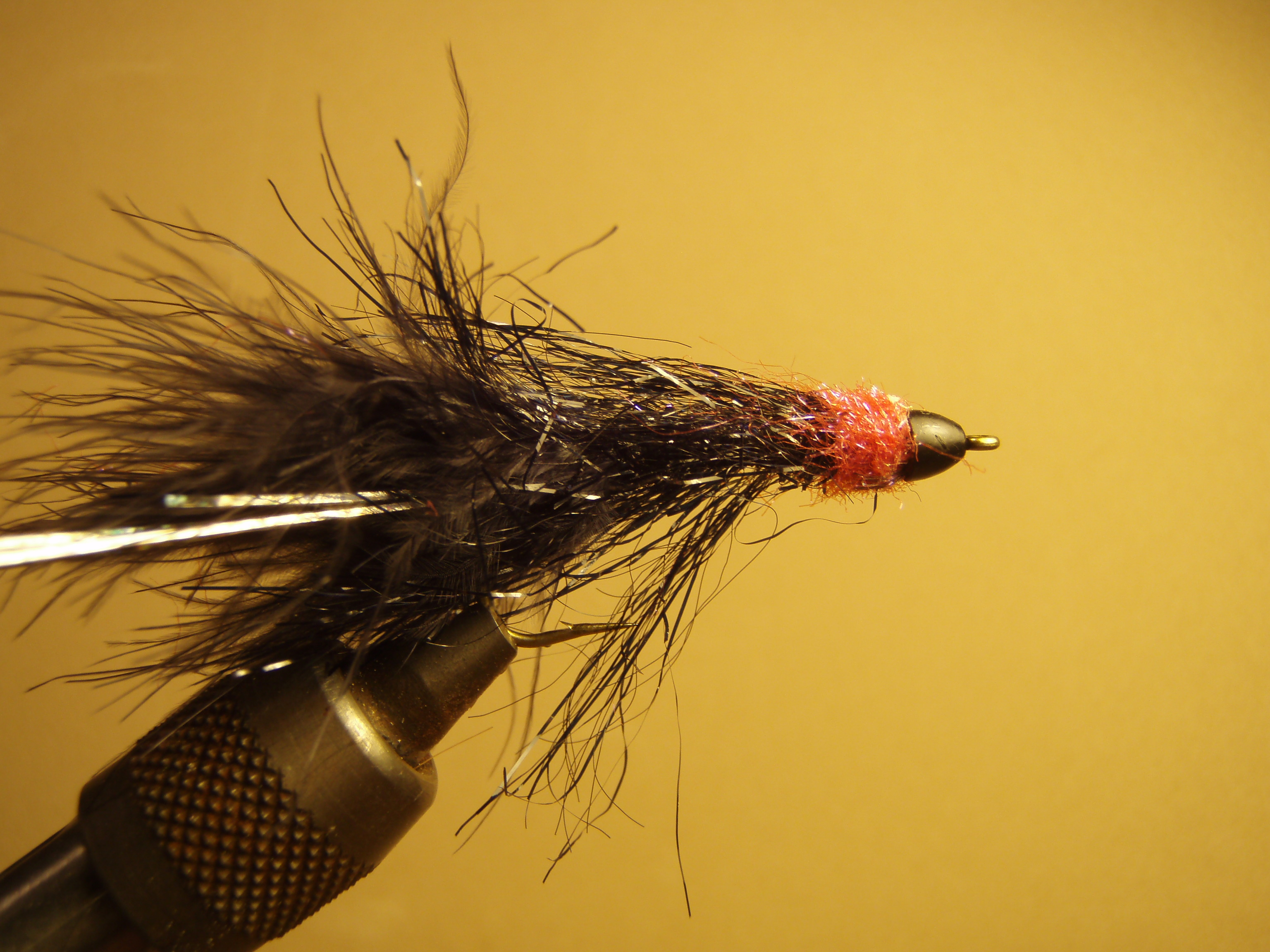
Black Conehead Egg Sucking Leech

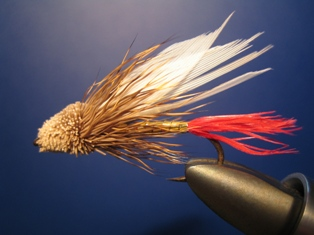
Muddler Minnow – a sculpin imitation

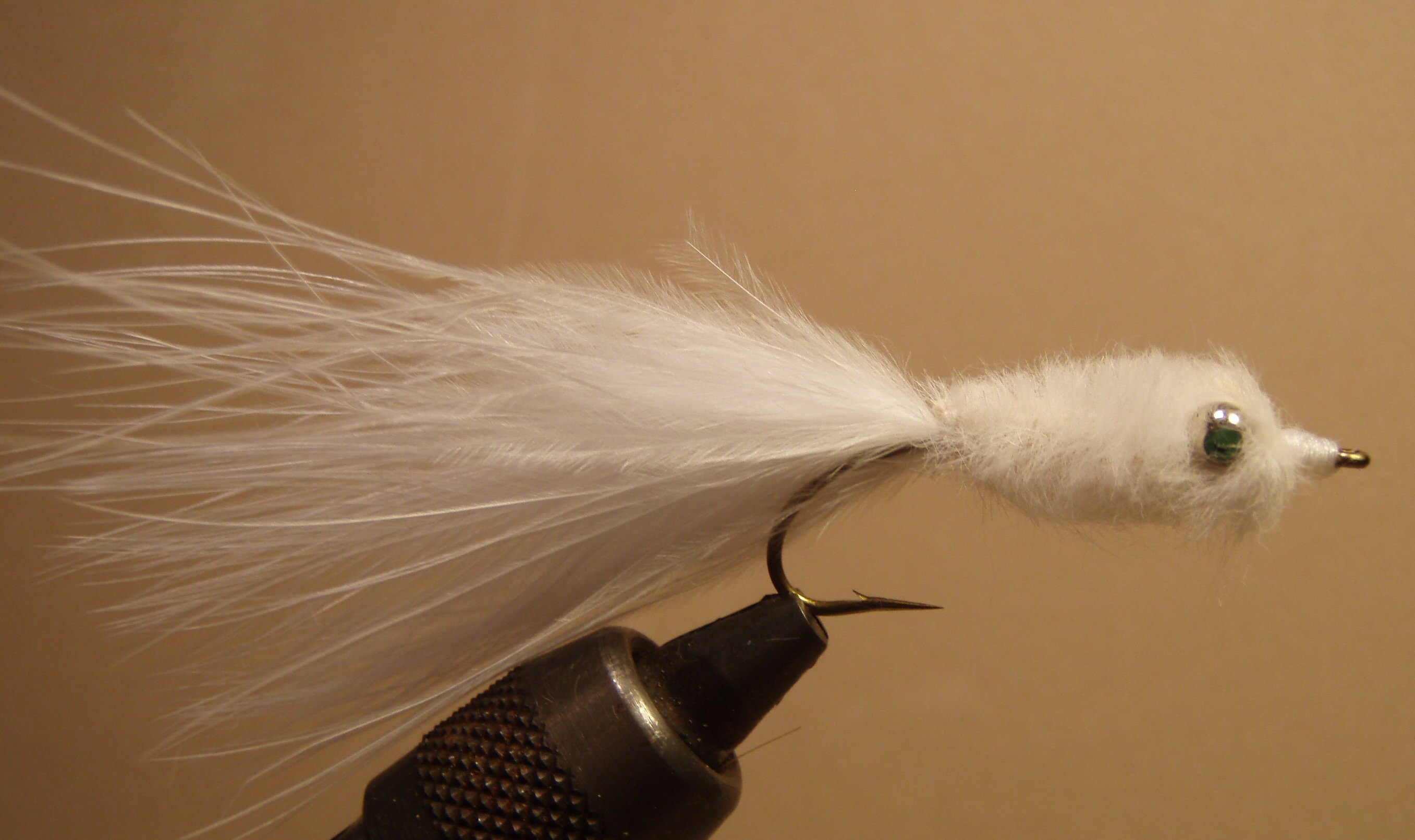
Schenk's White Minnow – A popular eastern chub imitation

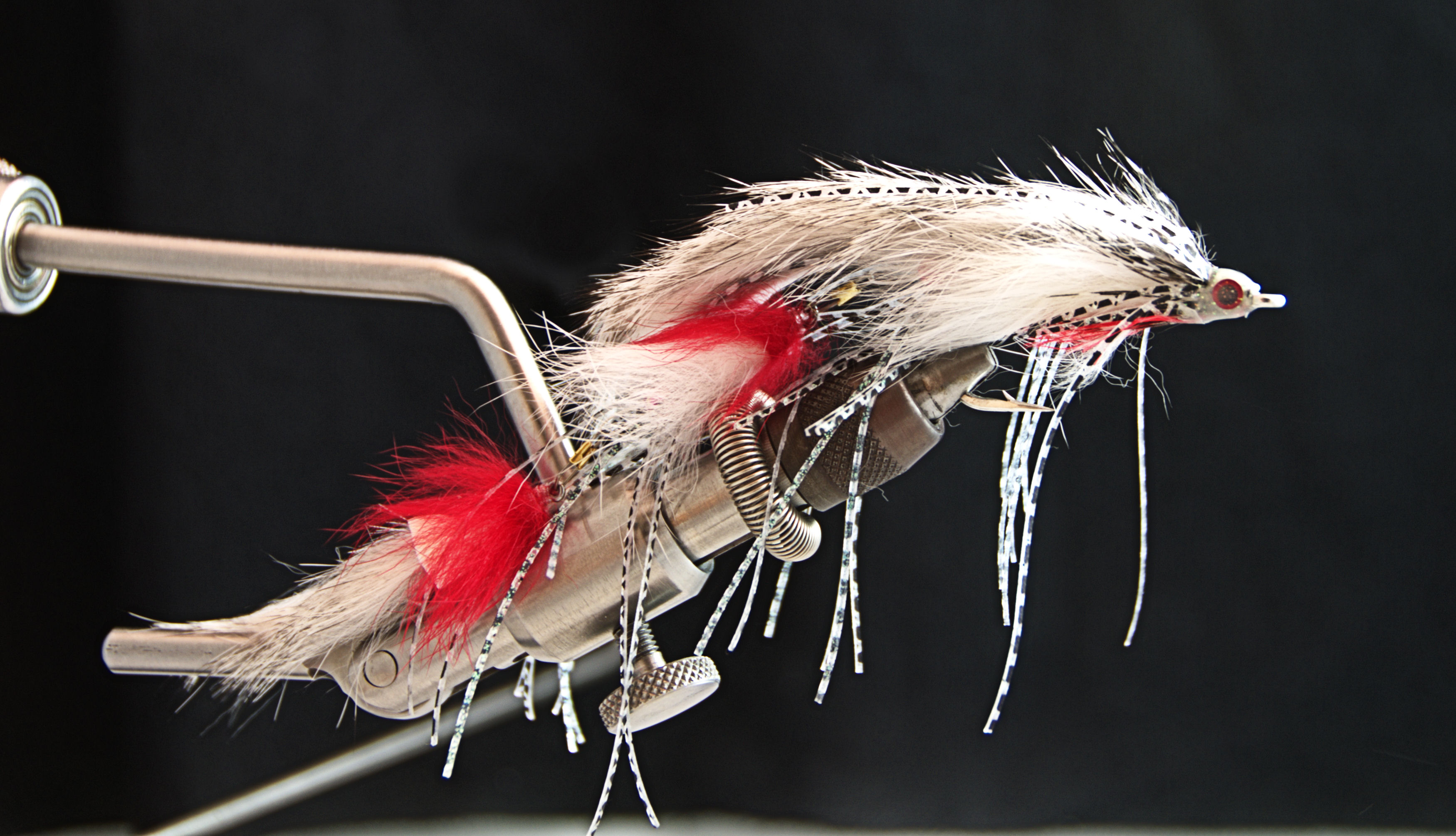
Articulated streamer

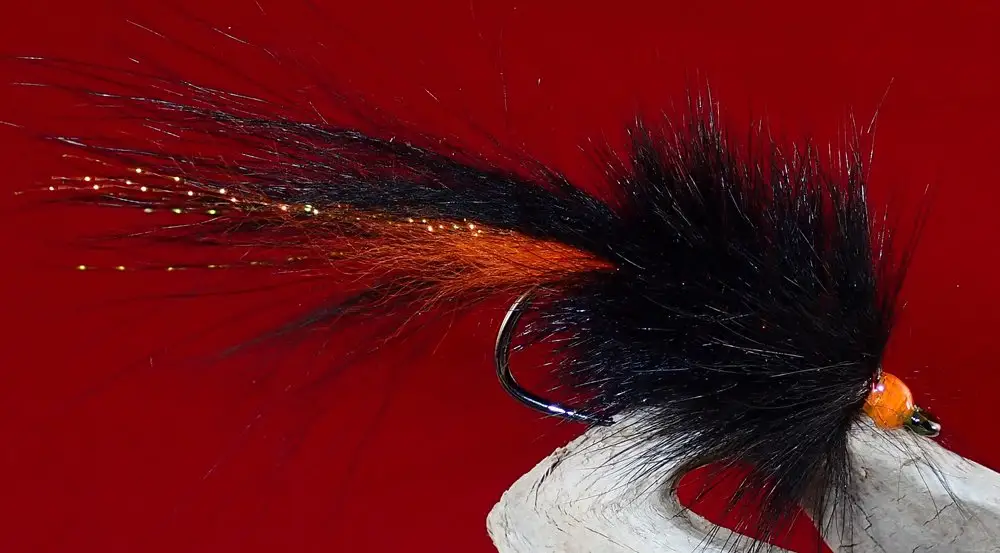
Large Woolly Bugger with Finn Raccoon and Pine Squirrel

=== Terrestrial flies ===
Terrestrials are designed to resemble non-aquatic insects, spiders, earthworms and small mammals that could fall prey to feeding fish after being blown or falling onto the water.

Terrestrial flies
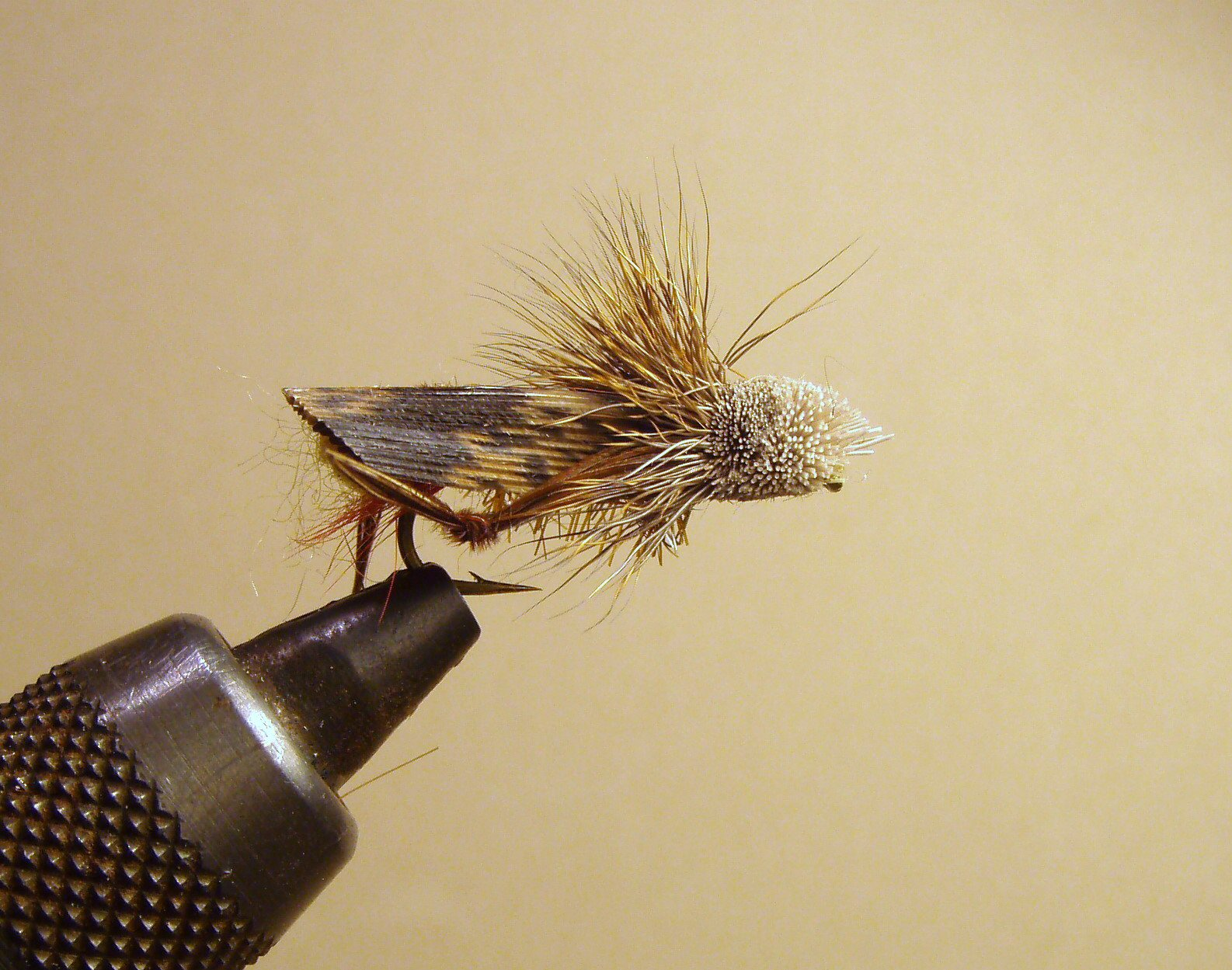
Dave's Hopper, a terrestrial dry fly imitating a common grasshopper

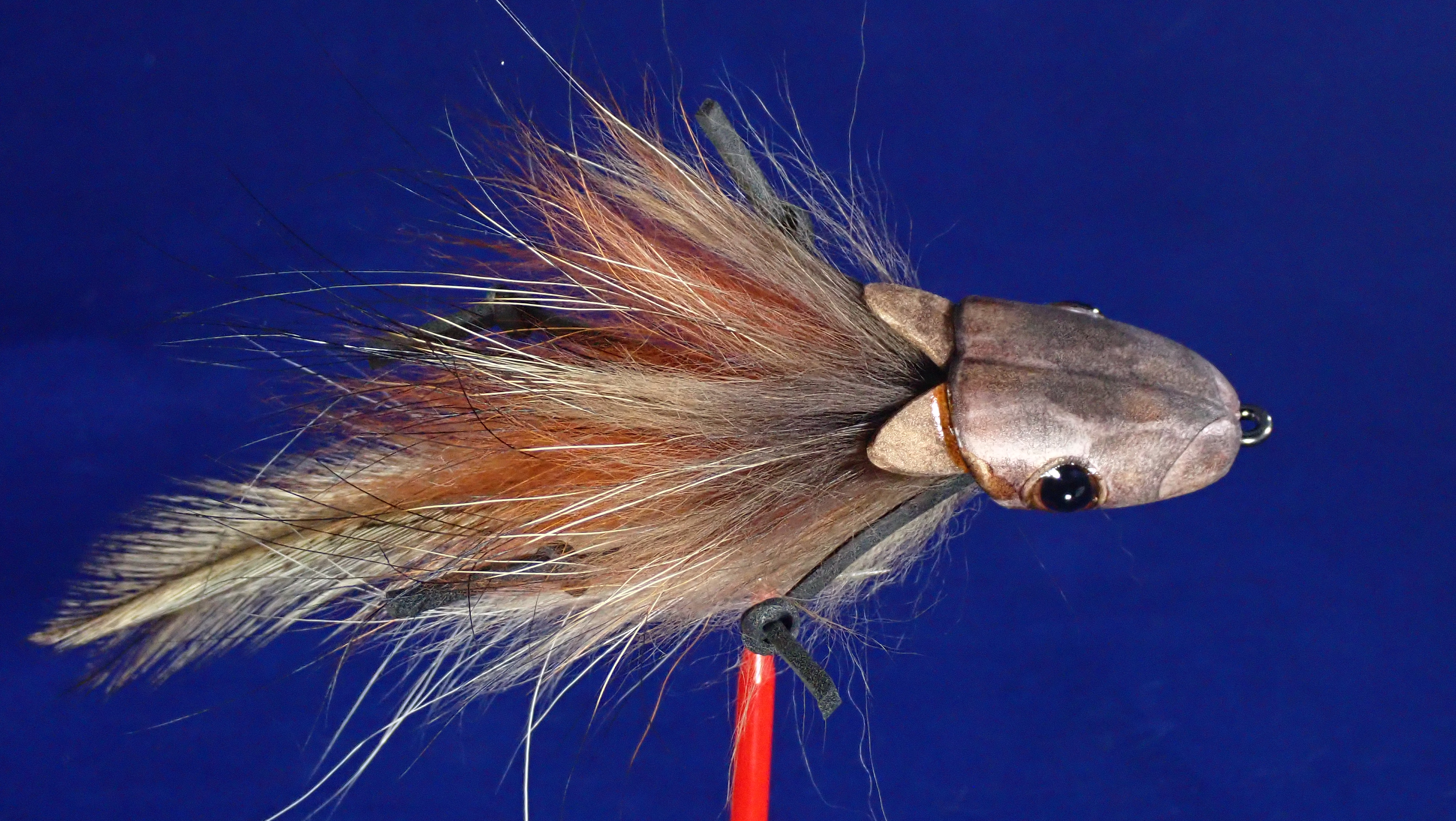
Mouse Fly, imitating a small mammal

=== Bass and panfish flies, bugs and poppers ===
Bass and panfish flies, bugs and poppers are generally designed to resemble both surface and sub-surface insect, crustacean, baitfish prey consumed by warm-water species such as Largemouth bass or bluegill. This genus of flies generally includes patterns that resemble small mammals, birds, amphibians or reptiles that may fall prey to fish, or in the case of panfish flies, small aquatic insects or crustaceans.

Bass and panfish flies
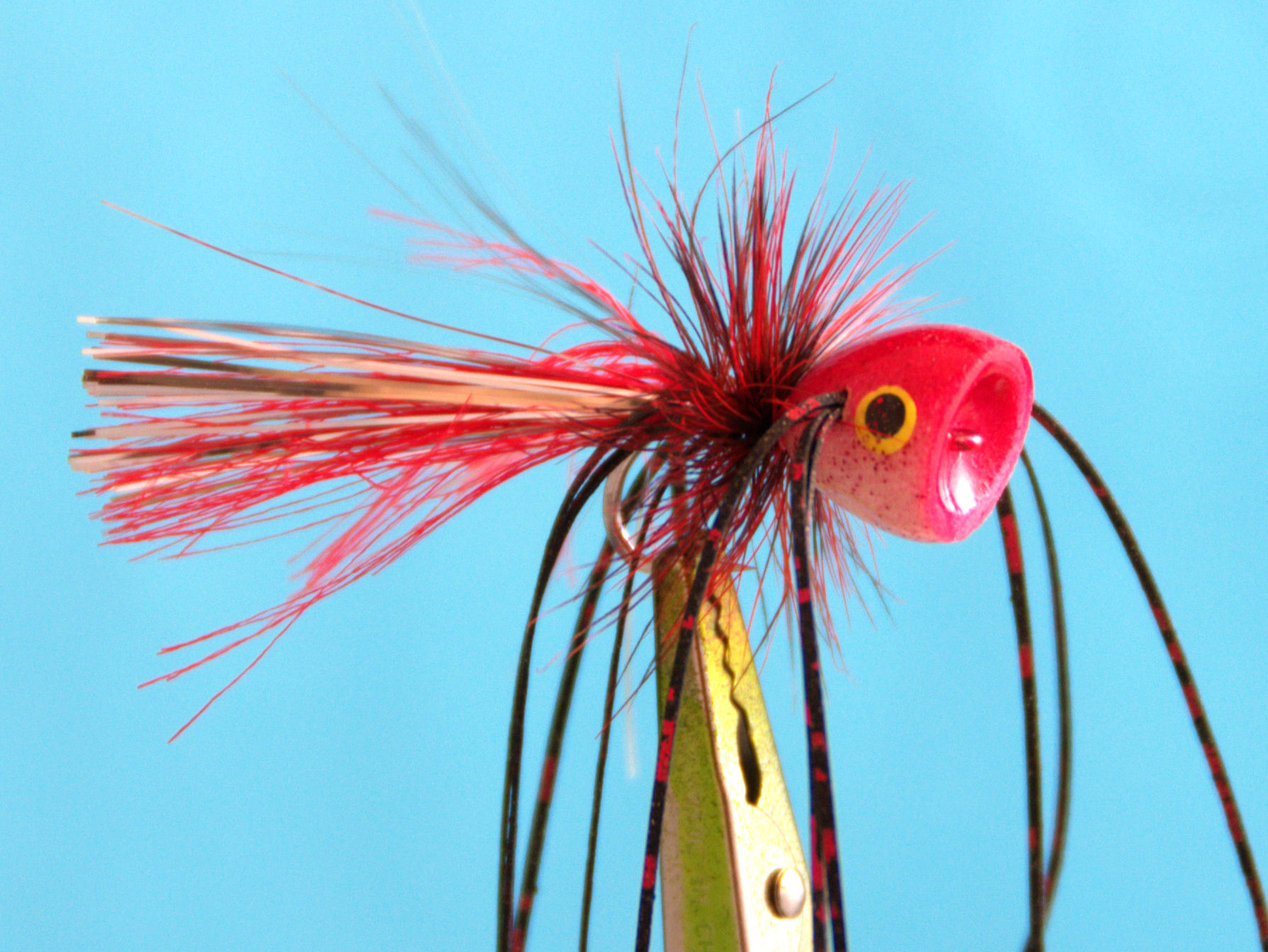
Red Bass popper

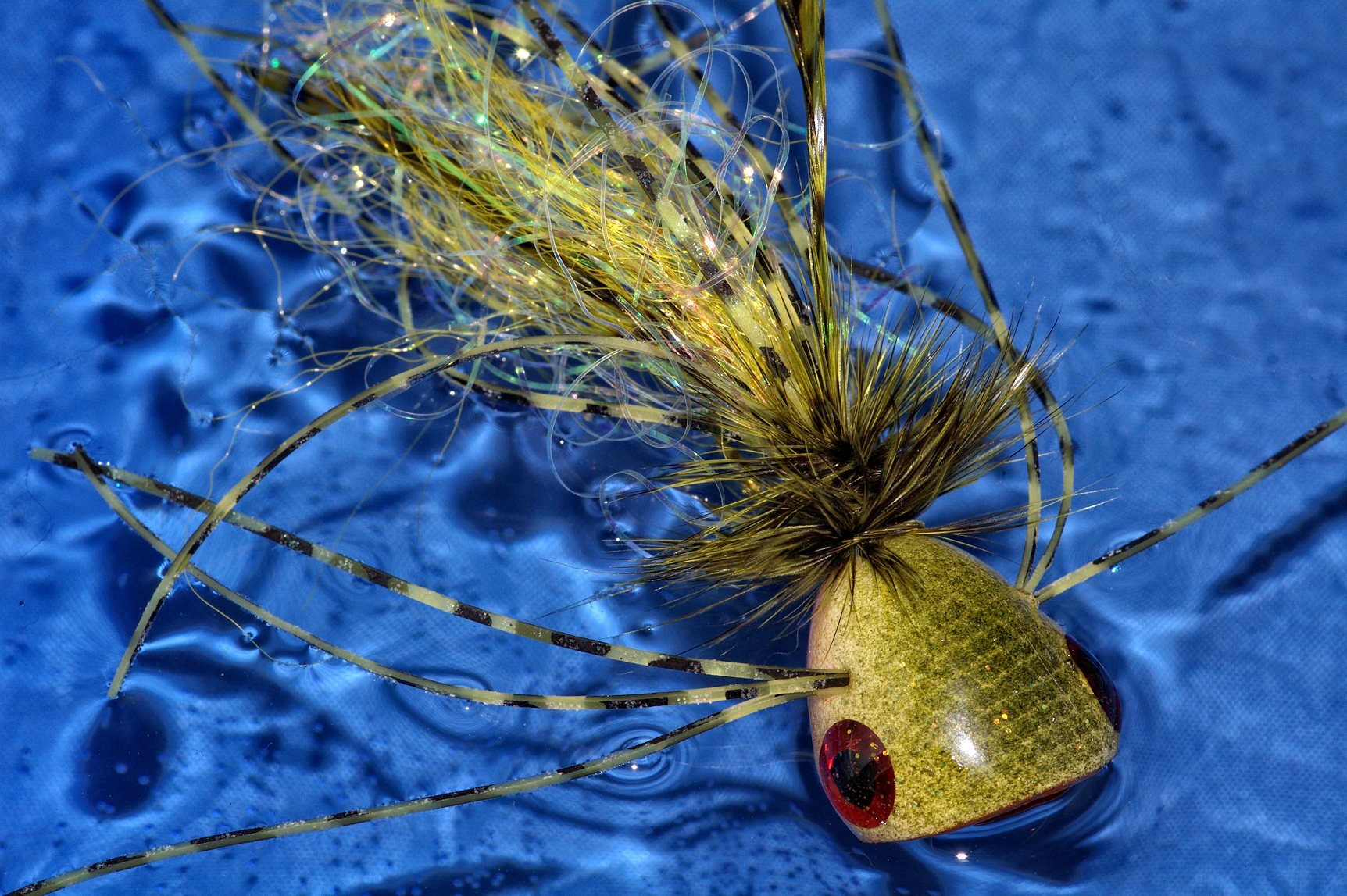
Bass popper on water

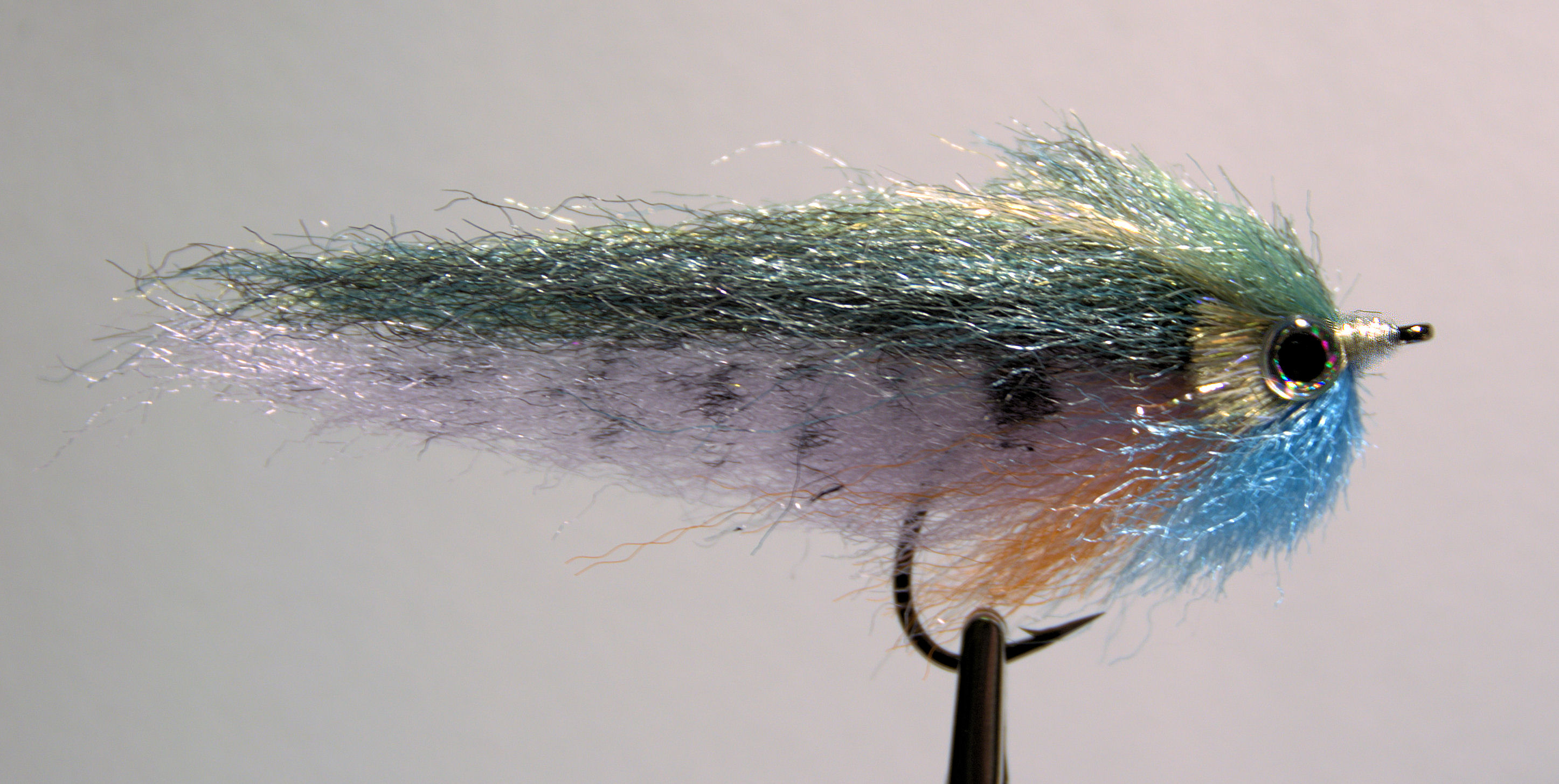
Bluegill streamer EP style

=== Pike and musky flies ===
Pike and musky flies are generally designed to resemble both surface and sub-surface crustacean, baitfish prey consumed by species of the genus Esox such as Northern Pike or Muskellunge. This genus of flies are larger than bass flies and generally includes patterns that resemble baitfish and small mammals, birds, amphibians or reptiles that may fall prey to fish.

=== Carp flies ===
Although many flies from the standard trout repertoire can be successfully used to tempt various species of carp, particularly the common carp, a number of traditional patterns have been modified to make them more appealing to carp. One example would be Barry's Carp Fly, which resembles the familiar thorax-plus-tapered-abdomen structure of many nymphs, albeit in an enlarged and bushier format. Some flies have been designed specifically to target carp, usually to imitate the various vegetative sources of food that omnivorous carp feed on such as berries, seeds, and flowers that may fall into the water. This small niche of the fly fishing / fly tying world began to grow dramatically in size and legitimacy around 2010 as a hitherto underground movement started to go mainstream in the United States, leading to numerous innovations. Several of those, like the family of so-called "headstand" flies, represent the most significant departures from traditional freshwater designs in many years.

=== Salmon flies ===
Salmon flies are a traditional class of flies tied specifically to fly fish for Atlantic Salmon. Some salmon flies may be classified as lures while others may be classified as dry flies, such as the bomber. Salmon flies are also tied in classic and contemporary patterns.

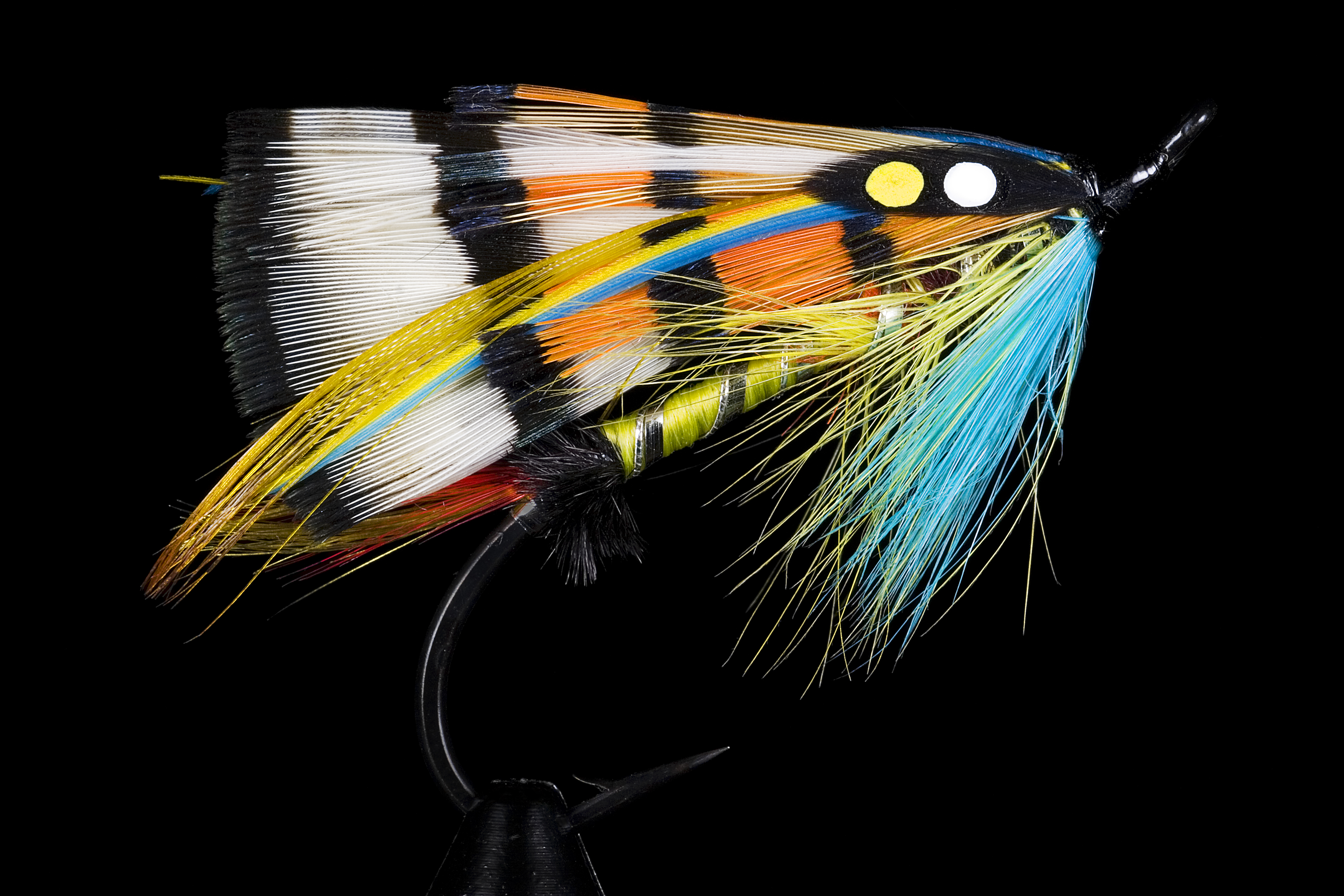
Durham Ranger (mid 19th Century)

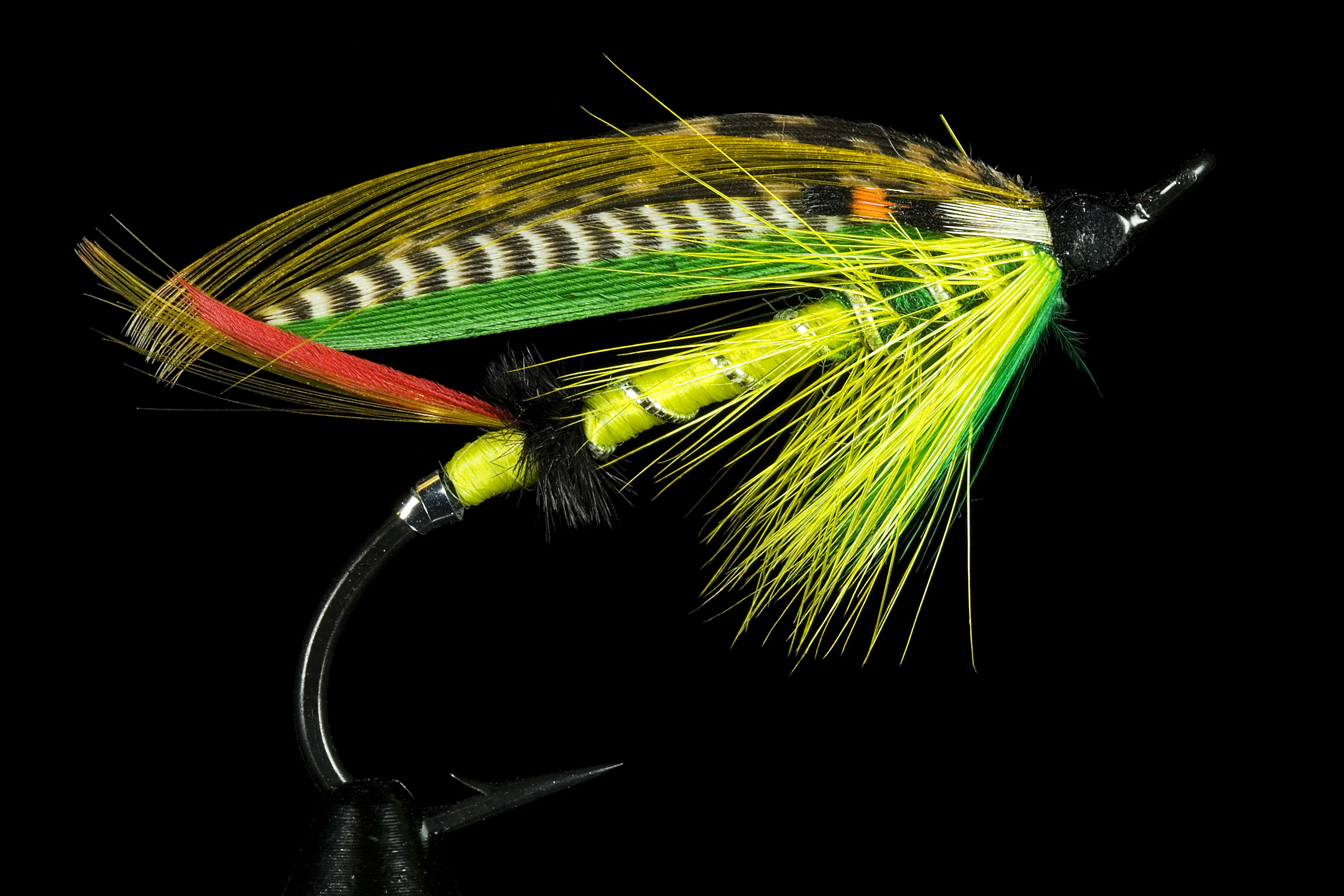
Green Highlander (1914)

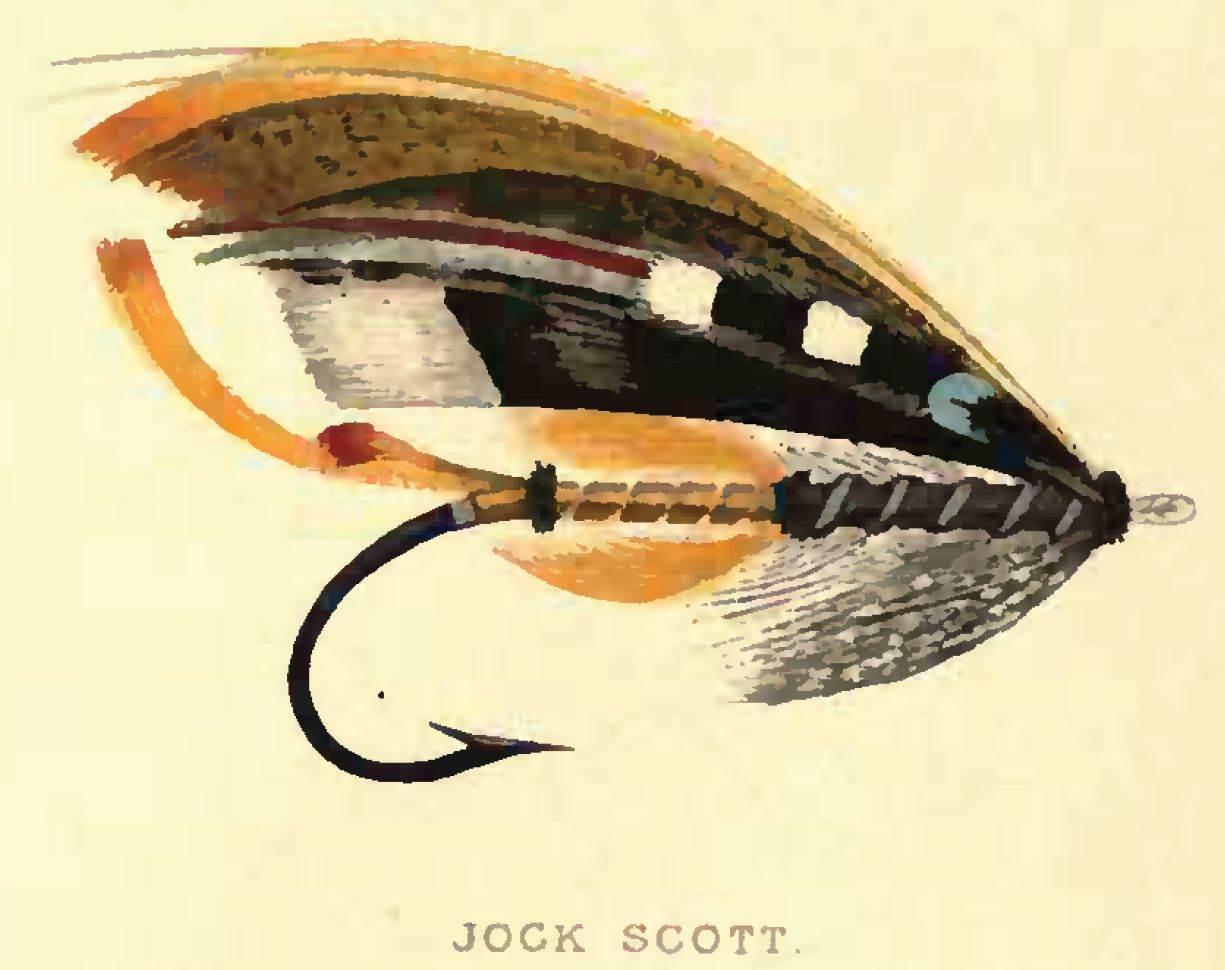
Jock Scott (1850)

=== Steelhead and Pacific salmon flies ===
Steelhead and Pacific salmon flies are designed for catching anadromous steelhead trout and pacific salmon in western North American and Great Lakes rivers.

=== Egg flies ===
Egg flies are all designed to resemble the spawn of other fish that may be encountered in a river and consumed by the target species.

=== Flesh flies ===
Flesh flies are designed to resemble the rotting flesh of pacific salmon encountered in a river and consumed by the target species.

=== Saltwater flies ===
Saltwater flies are a class of flies designed to represent a wide variety of inshore, offshore and estuarial saltwater baitfish, crustacean and other saltwater prey. Most of the time you see a pattern it will be represent a shrimp, crab, baitfish, or a combination of them. Saltwater flies generally are found in both sub-surface and surface patterns.

Saltwater flies
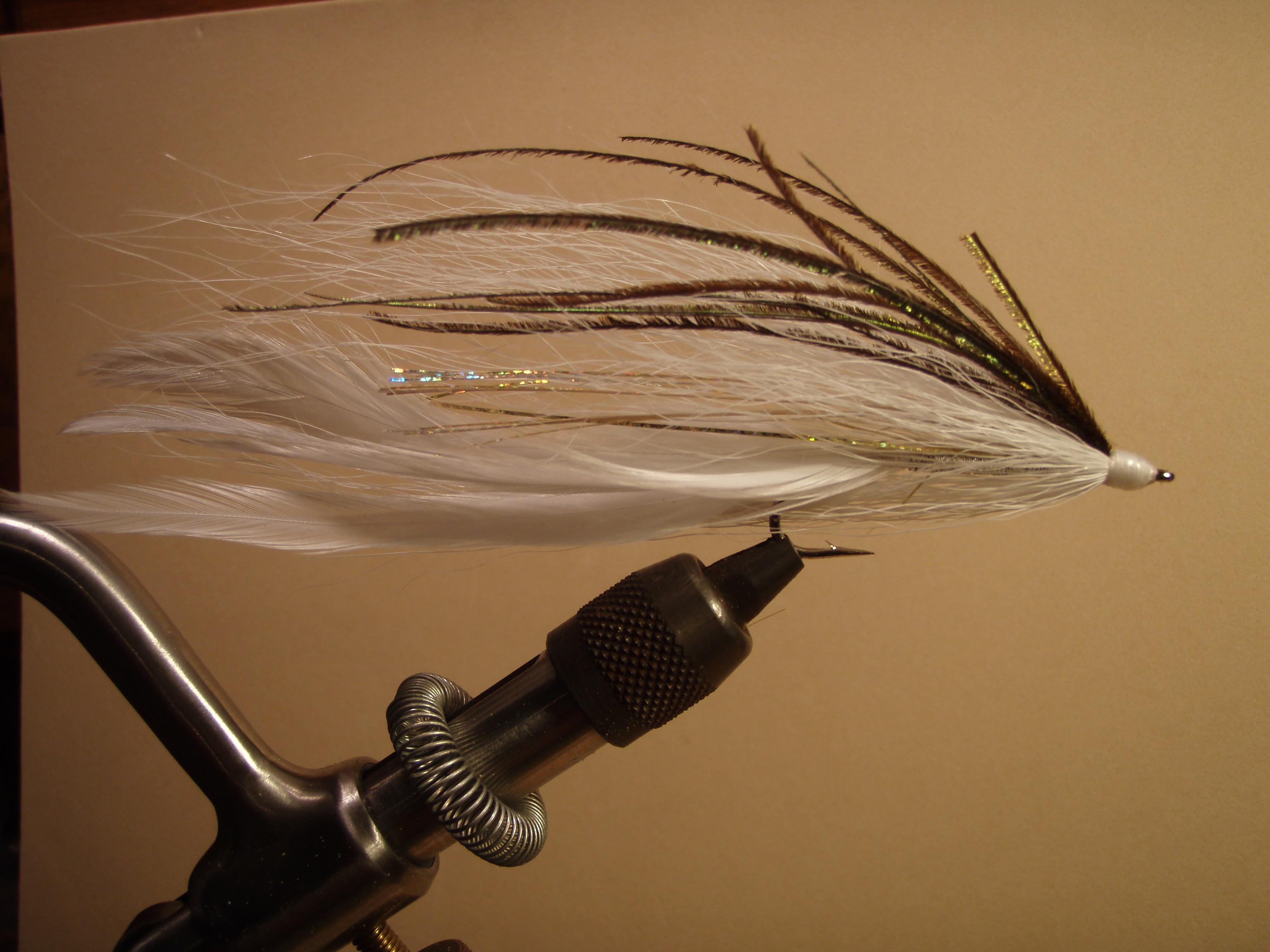
White Lefty's Deceiver – An all-purpose saltwater baitfish imitation

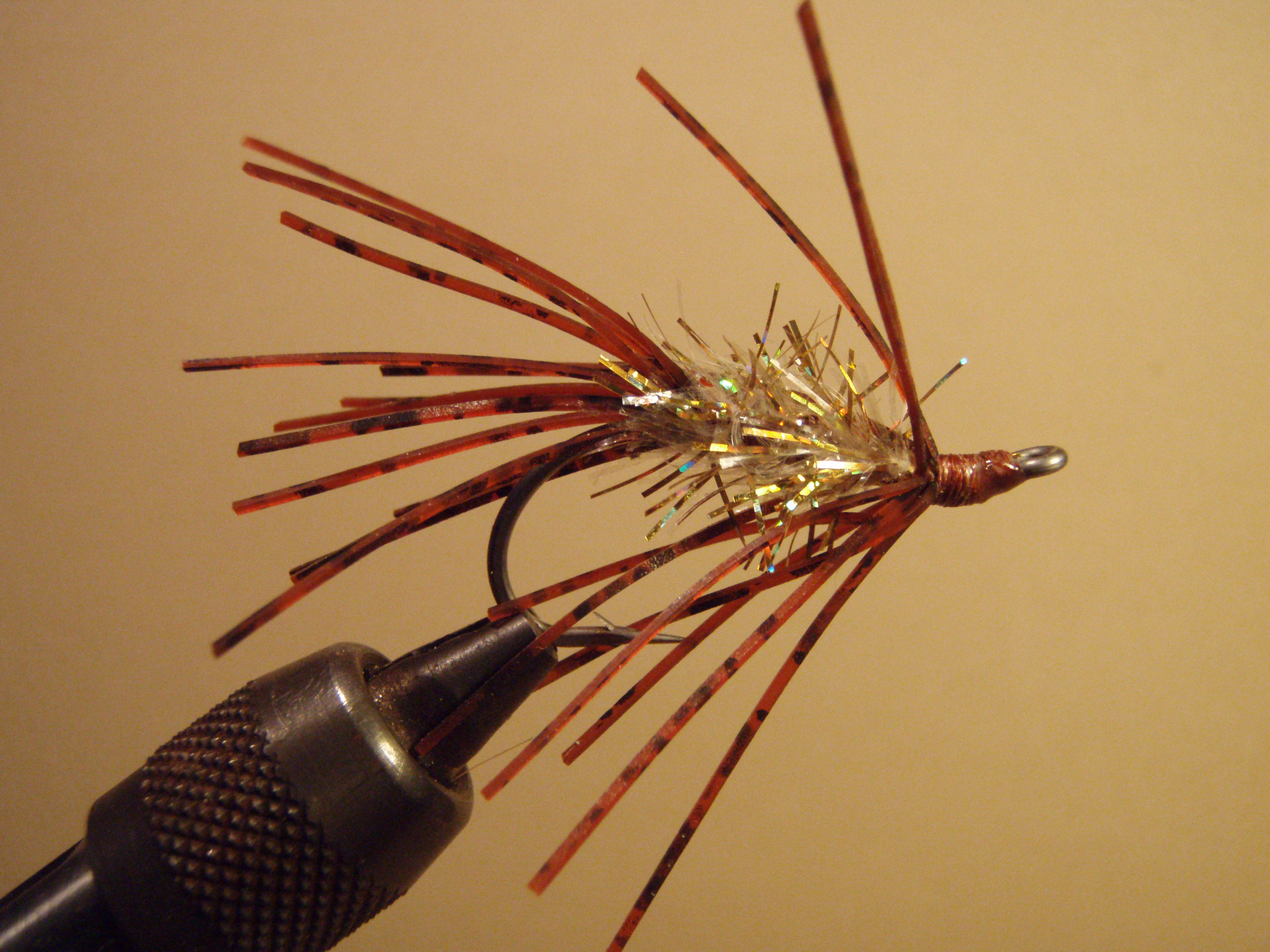
Gold bendback shrimp fly

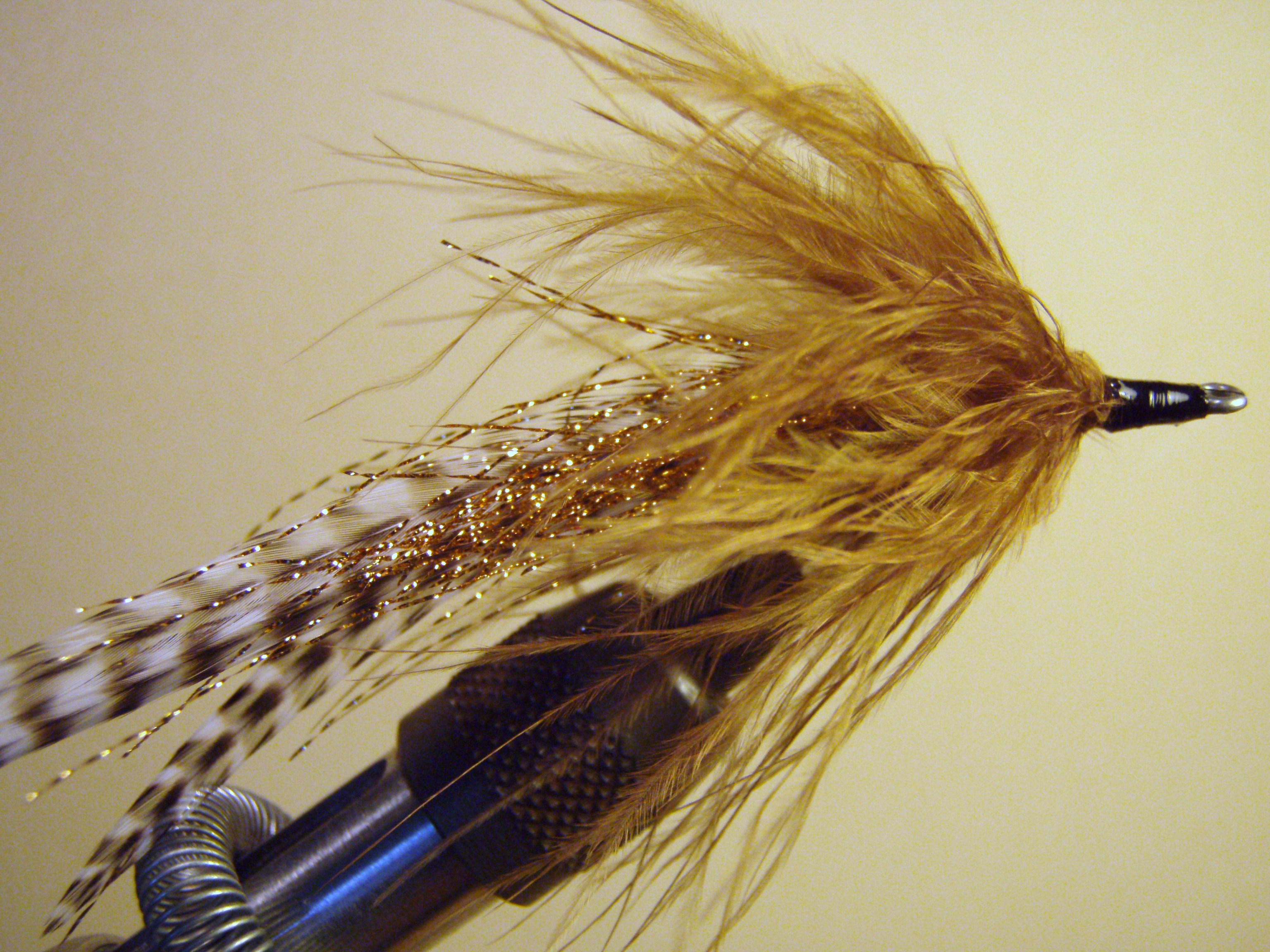
Cockroach Deceiver (Lefty Kreh)

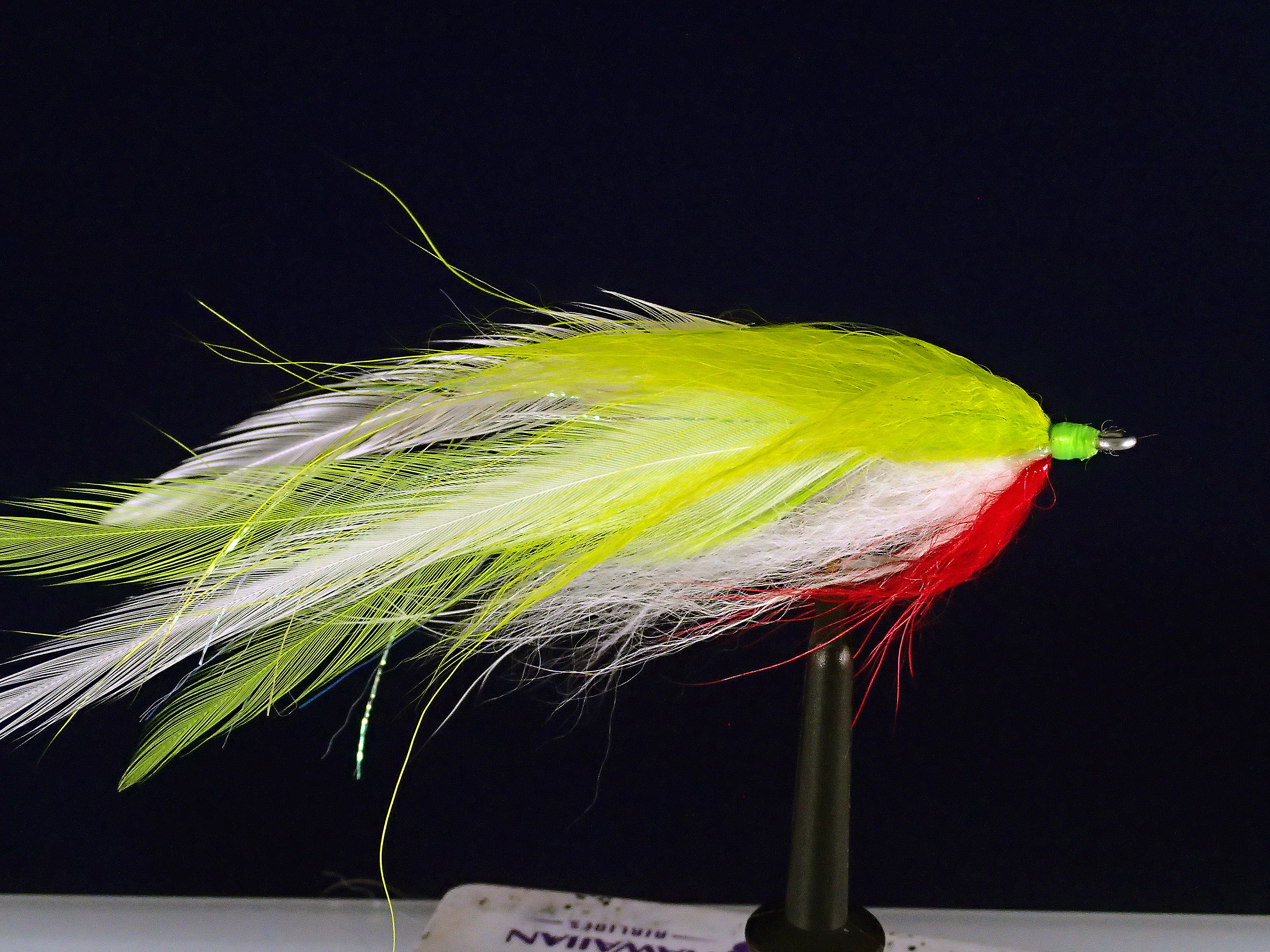
White and Chartreuse fur Deceiver

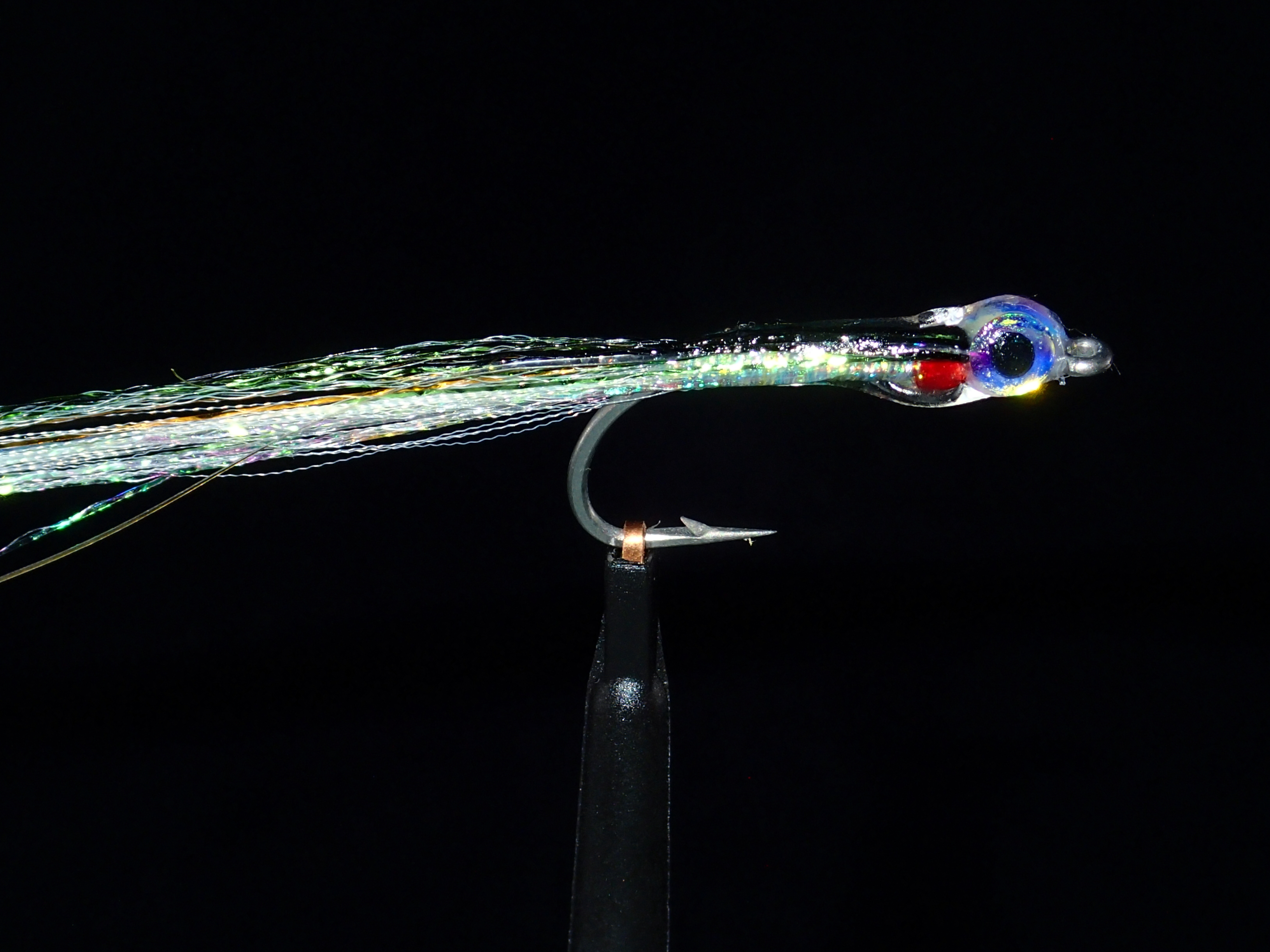
Surf Candy

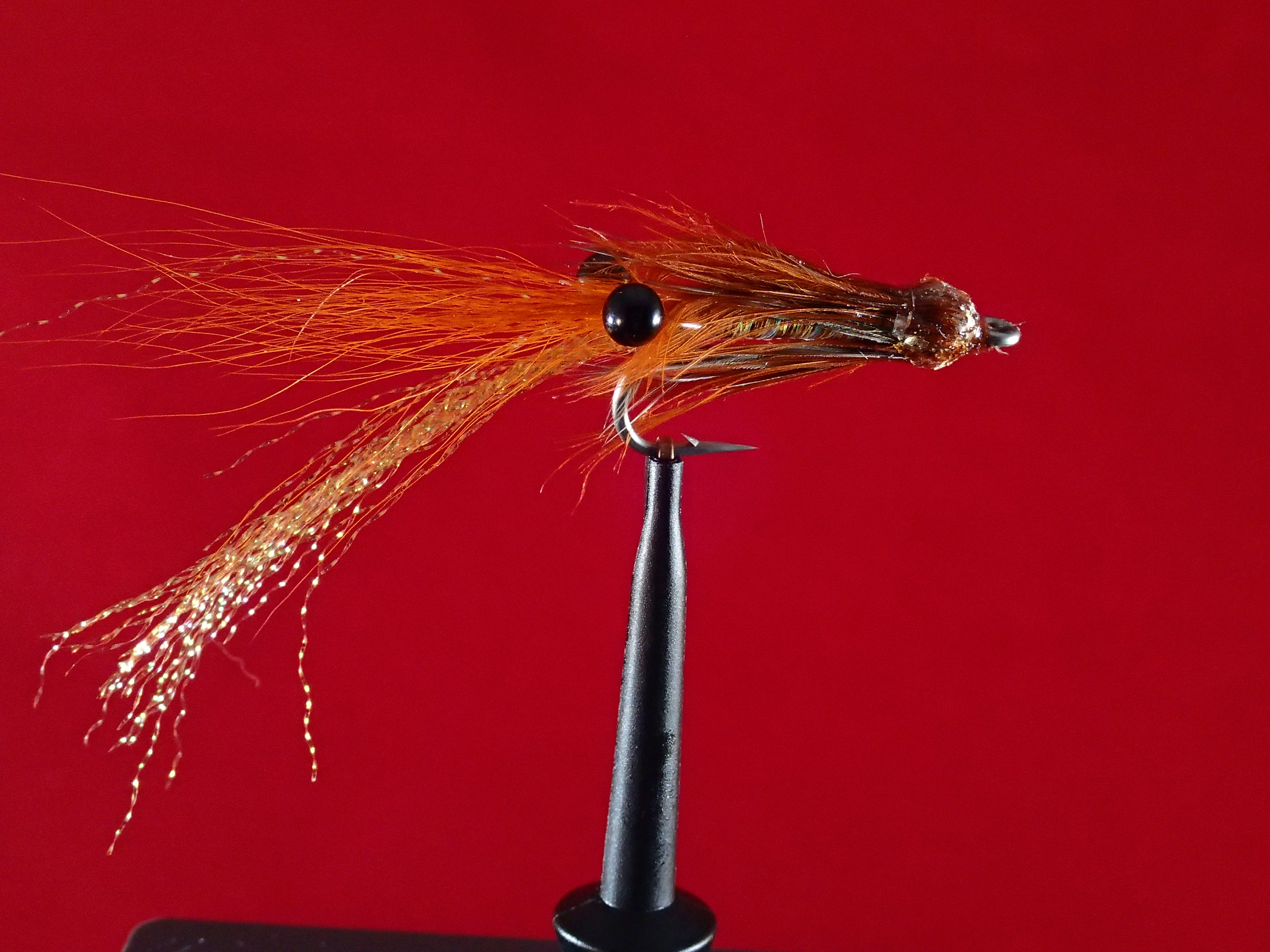
Shrimp fly variation

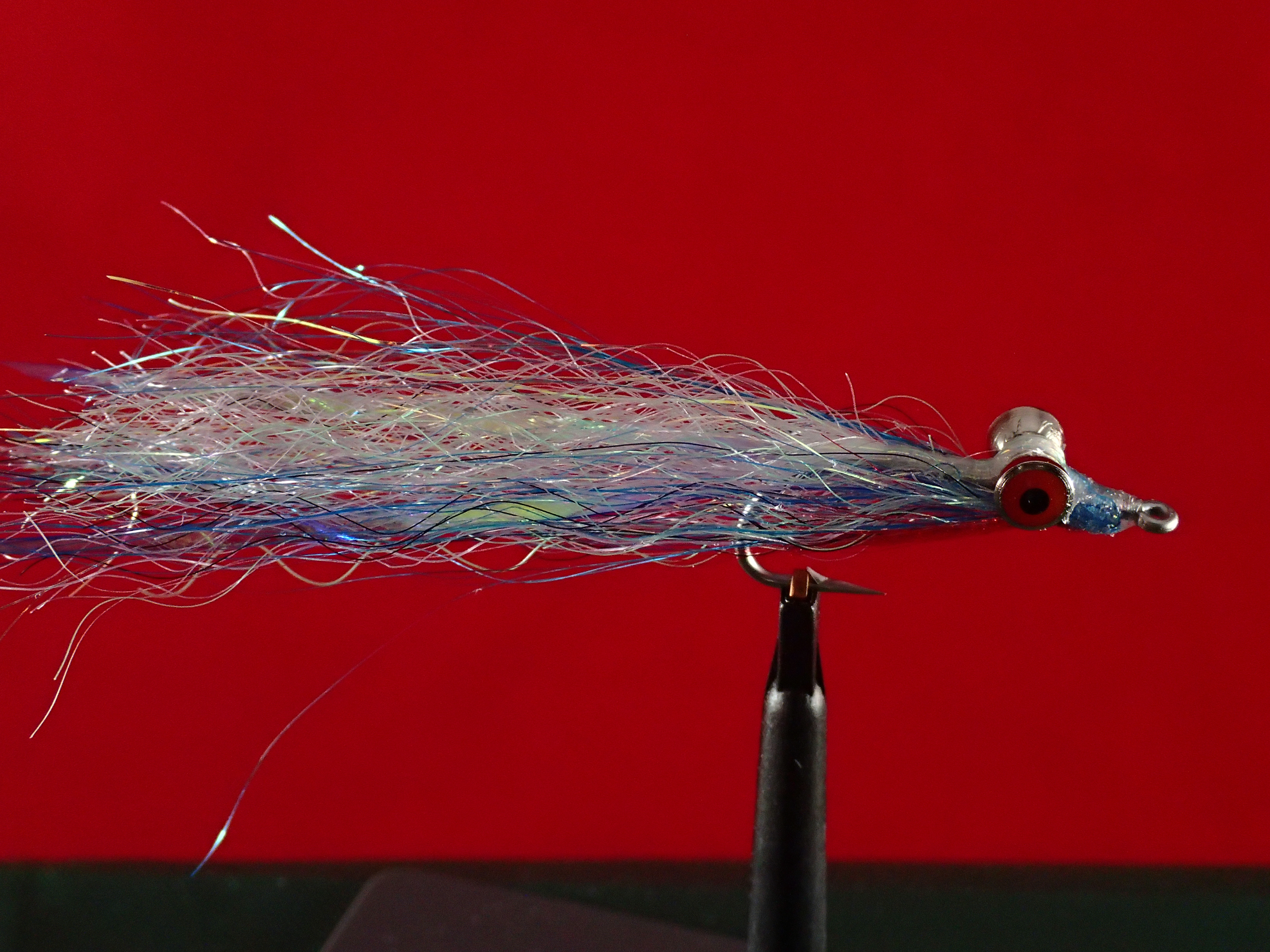
Clouser deep minnow, saltwater variation

=== Bonefish flies ===
Bonefish flies are a special class of saltwater flies used to catch bonefish in shallow water. Bonefish flies generally resemble small crabs, shrimp or other crustaceans.

Bonefish flies
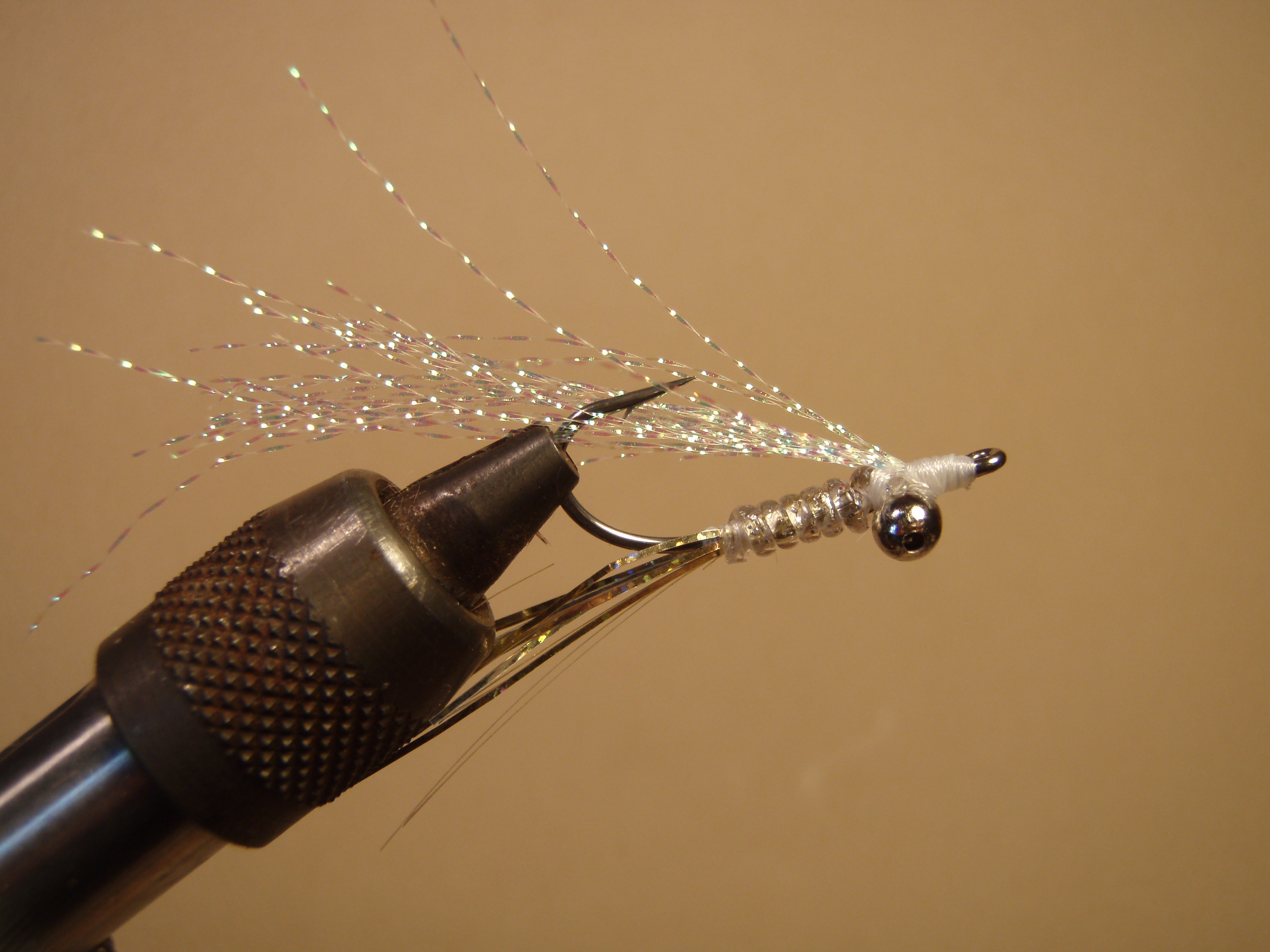
Crazy Charlie – A popular bonefish fly

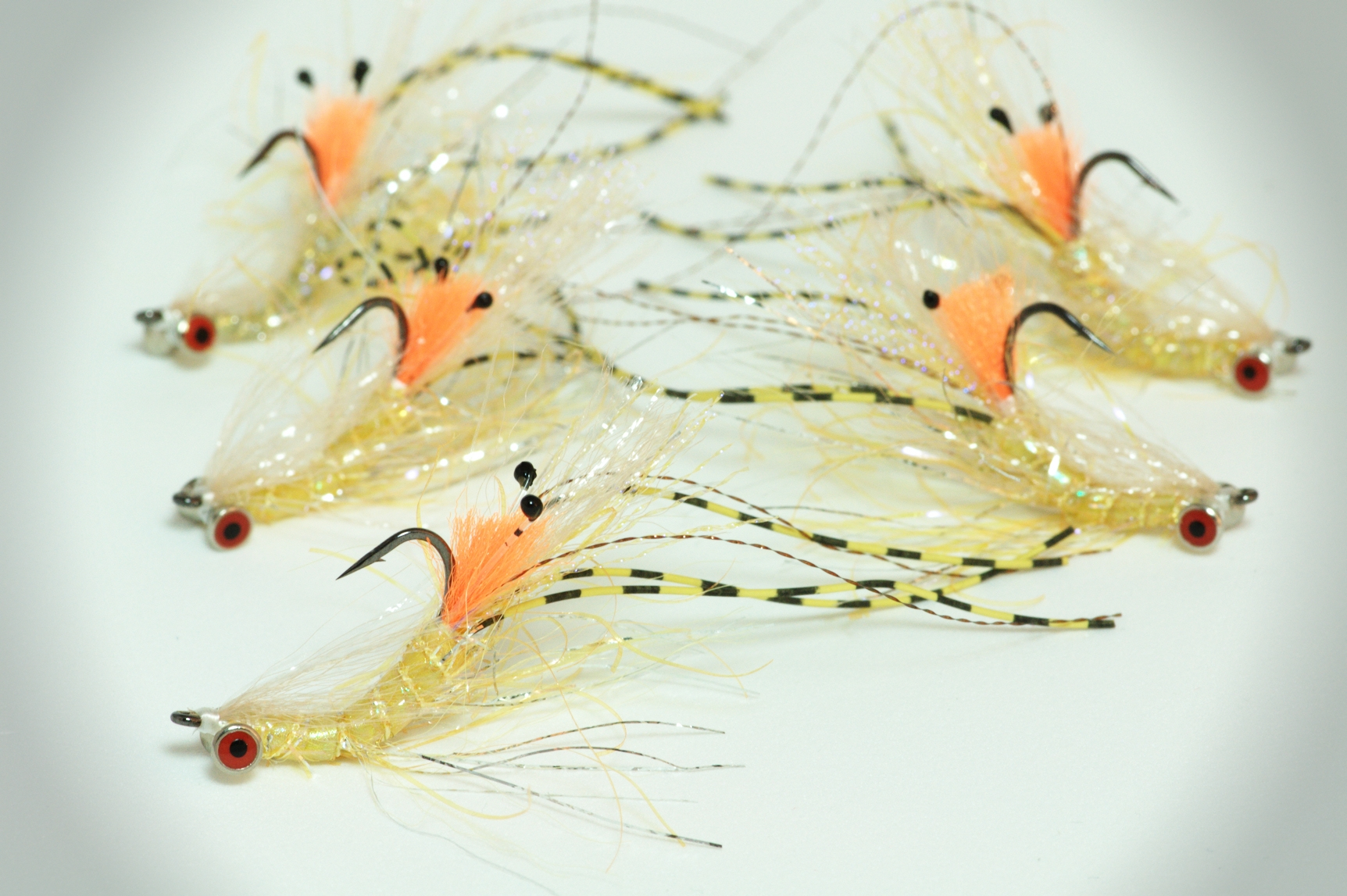
Bonefish shrimp fly

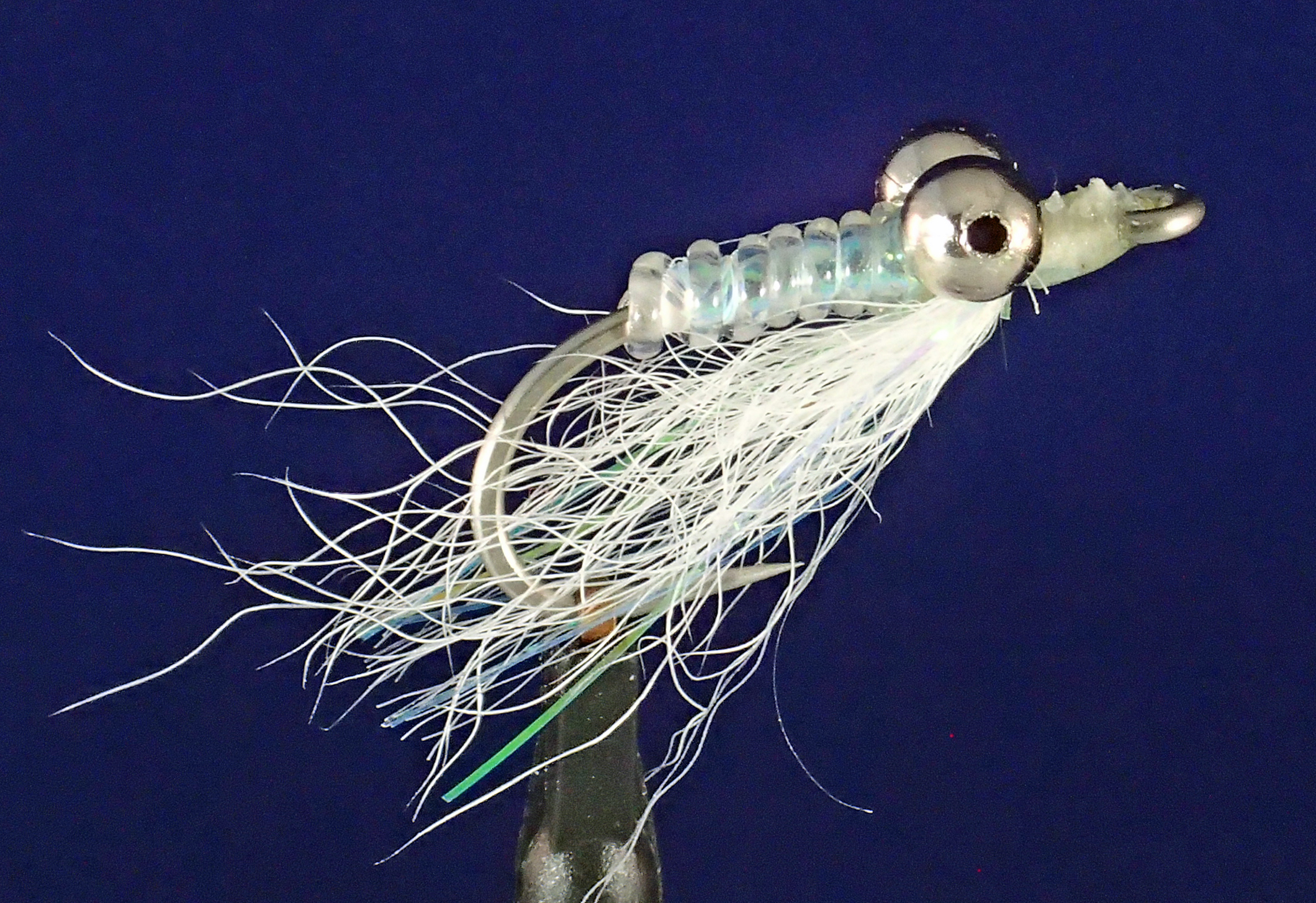
Traditional Crazy Charlie

=== Tarpon flies ===
Tarpon flies are a special class of saltwater flies used to catch tarpon in both inshore and offshore waters. Tarpon flies generally represent small baitfish commonly preyed upon by tarpon.

Tarpon flies
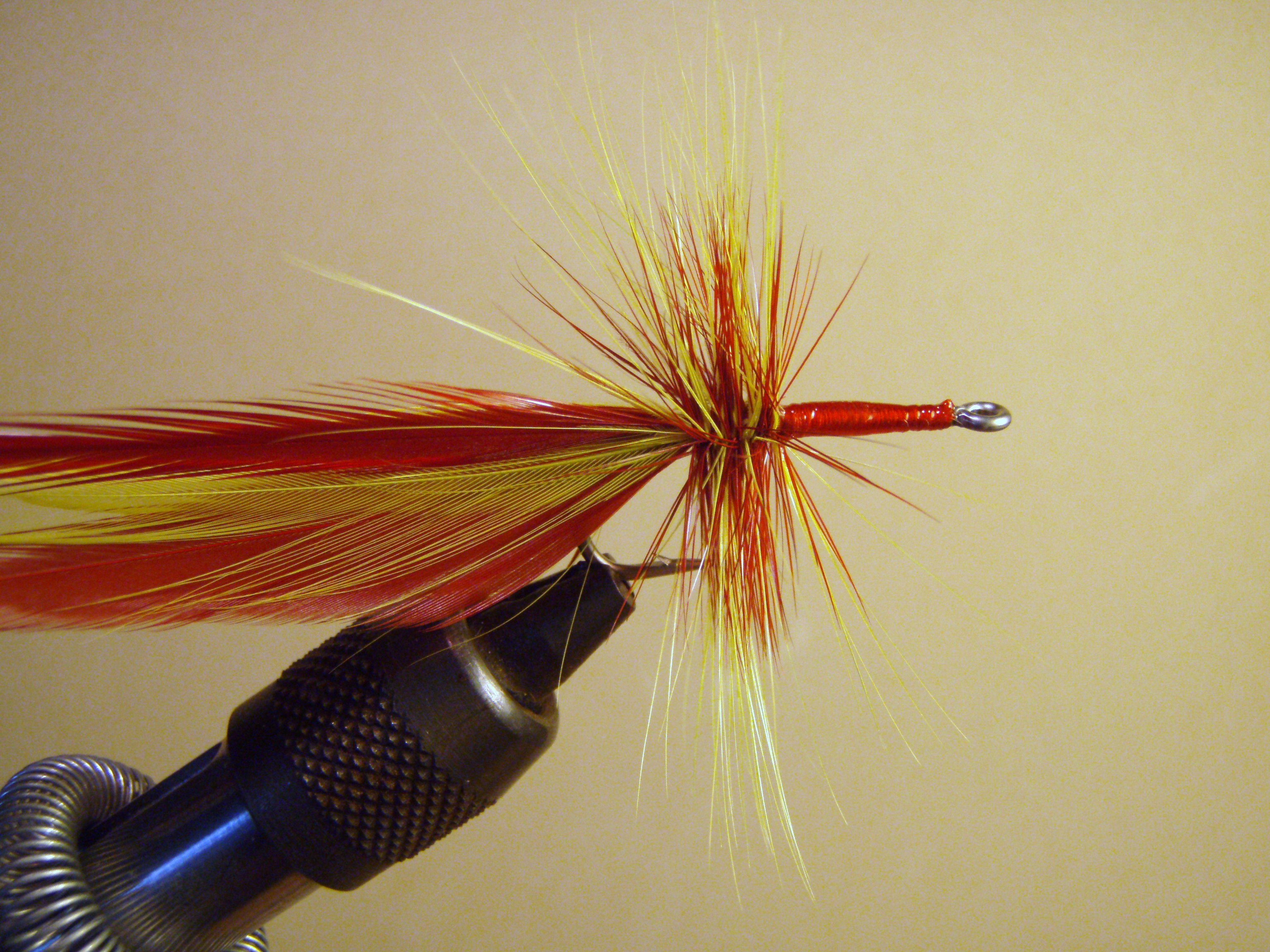
Stu Apte classic Tarpon fly

=== Striped bass flies ===
Striped bass flies are a special class of freshwater-saltwater fly used to catch striped bass in freshwater, inshore and offshore waters. Striped bass flies generally represent small baitfish commonly preyed upon by striped bass.

=== Tube flies ===
A tube fly is a general tying style of artificial fly. Tube flies differ from traditional artificial flies as they are tied on small diameter tubes, not hooks. Tube flies were originated in Aberdeen, Scotland by fly-dresser Minnie Morawski for Atlantic salmon anglers around 1945. Tube flies were designed to improve hooking success and to prevent damage to complex and expensive salmon flies by the teeth of hooked salmon. Tube flies have been widely adapted to fly patterns for a variety of cold water and warm water species and are extremely popular for steelhead and salmon in the Pacific Northwest and northeast United States, as well as saltwater species along the Atlantic, Florida and Gulf Coasts. They are widely used in European waters for Atlantic salmon, sea trout and pike.

== See also ==
- Fully dressed flies
