= Jack Gartside =

- Born: December 7, 1942; Revere, Massachusetts
- Died: December 5, 2009 (aged 66); Stoneham, Massachusetts
- Occupations: fly tyer, author, fisherman
- Website: jackgartside.com

John Clarence "Jack" Gartside was an American fly tyer and fly fishing author.

Considered one of the most talented and innovative fly tyers of the modern era, Gartside was taught how to tie flies at the age of 10 by Ted Williams, the Boston Red Sox outfielder. Among his best-known original patterns are the Sparrow, the Soft Hackle Streamer, the Pheasant Hopper, the Gartside Leech, the FishHead, and the Gurgler. His designs have been featured in Eric Leiser's "Book of Fly Patterns," Judith Dunham's "The Art of the Trout Fly," Lefty Kreh's "Salt Water Fly Patterns," Dick Stewart's "Salt Water Flies," Bob Veverka's "Innovative Saltwater Flies," and Dick Brown's "Flyfishing for Bonefish." He was one of the first fly tyers to be profiled in Sports Illustrated (October 12, 1982). Gartside has been profiled in Robert H. Boyle's "Fishing Giants and Other Men of Derring-Do," and David Dibenedetto's "On the Run." In 2010 the Catskill Fly Fishing Center and Museum inducted Gartside into its fly fishing hall of fame. The American Museum of Fly Fishing added a number of Gartside items to its collection.

== Tying style ==
Gartside was a proponent of natural materials and the impressionist style of tying. A common theme in his patterns is blood marabou wound as hackle, as seen in his Soft Hackle Streamer and Soft Hackle Deceiver patterns. Although limited in his use of synthetic materials, he is credited with popularizing the use of corsair tubing (as seen in his FishHead and Floating Minnow patterns), and closed-cell foam (as used in his Gurgler pattern).

== Published works ==
- Flies for the 21st Century
- Fly Patterns for the Adventurous Tyer
- Flyfisherman's Guide to Boston Harbor
- Original Salt Water Fly Patterns
- Scratching the Surface
- Secret Flies
- Striper Flies
- Striper Strategies
