= Parks' Fly Shop =

Fishing supply store

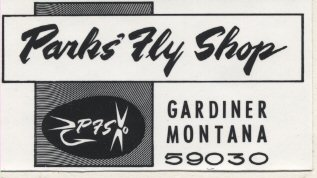
- Company type: Fly Shop and Outfitter
- Industry: Fishing
- Founded: Gardiner, Montana 1953
- Founder: Merton J. Parks
- Headquarters: 45°1′51″N 110°42′19″W, Gardiner, Montana, United States
- Area served: Park County, Montana and Yellowstone National Park
- Key people: Walter Wiese, Head Guide; Matt Minch, Fly Designer
- Products: Custom Flies
- Services: Guided Float and Wade Trips
- Owner: Richard Parks

Parks' Fly Shop is a fly shop and licensed fly fishing outfitter in Gardiner, Montana. In business since 1953, the shop located at 202 2nd Street between Main and Stone is the oldest business in Gardiner under continuous family ownership.

== History ==
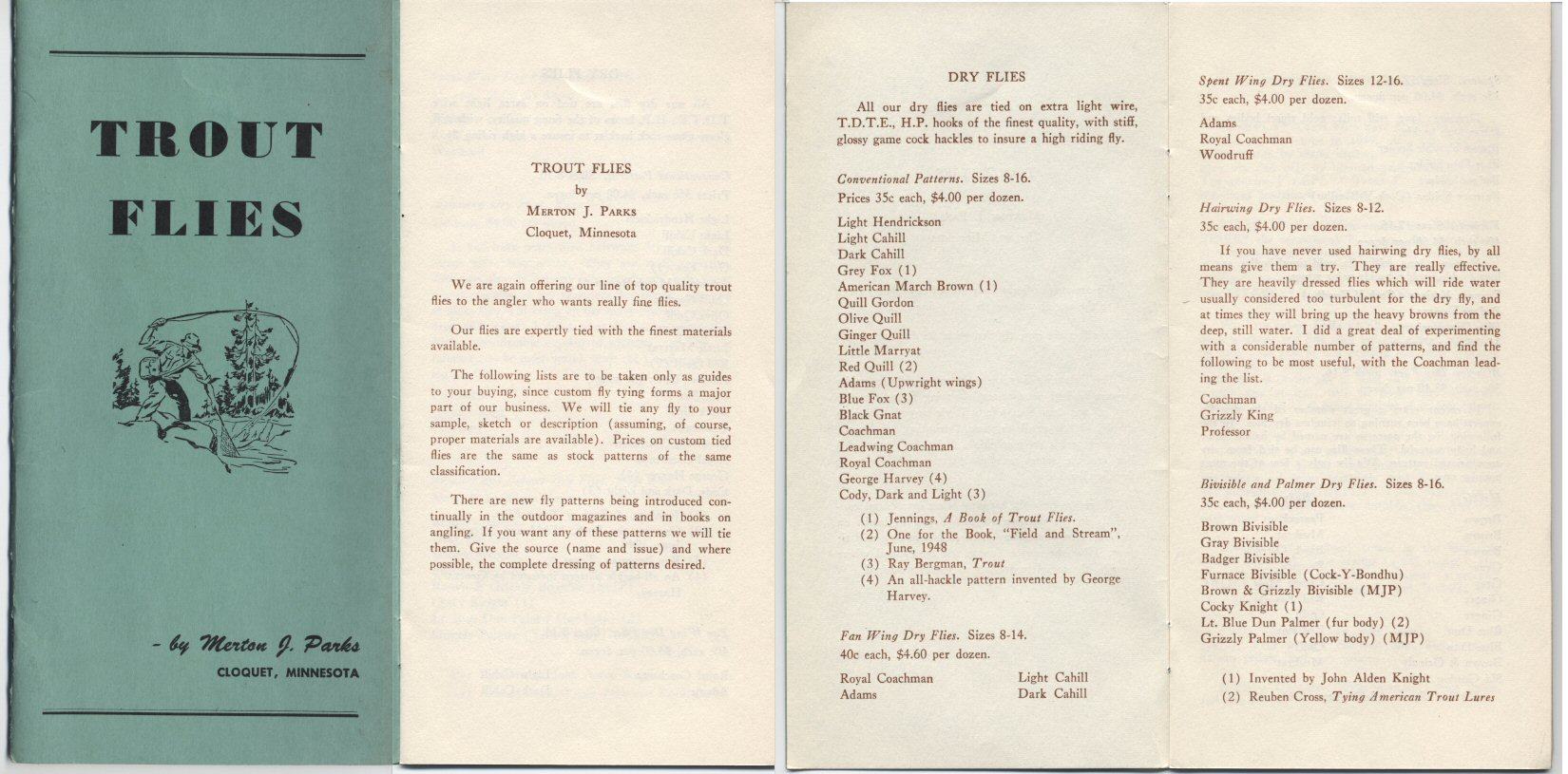
Merton Parks Trout Fly Catalog, circa 1950

In the late 1940s, Merton J. Parks (1916-1970) was an executive in the paper industry in Cloquet, Minnesota. Merton's avocations however were fly fishing and fly tying. He was an accomplished trout fisherman in the trout streams along the north shore of Lake Superior. His fly tying skills were such that many of his friends encouraged him to tie flies for them. Therefore, Merton started a small, part-time mailorder fly tying operation.

In the summer of 1947, Merton took his family, including his four-year-old son, Richard, on a trip to Montana and Yellowstone National Park. It was on this trip that Merton met Dan Bailey of Livingston, Montana. By early 1952, Merton had decided to quit the paper industry and move his family and fly-tying business to Montana. With the help of Dan Bailey, Merton established Parks' Fly Shop in the back of a small store on W. Park Street, Gardiner, Montana in the summer of 1953.

In 1952, I was looking for retail shop accounts to get our wholesale tackle business off the ground, and Richard's late father, Merton Parks, was looking for a place to open a quality fly shop. Together, we found Gardiner to be a suitable location. Merton was an outstanding sportsman, a fine fisherman, and an excellent fly tier who quickly became a good friend as well. Dan Bailey, 1978

The small fly shop remained at the W. Park Street location for less than a year. In early 1954, Merton moved the business to a small store on S. 2nd Street that had been relocated from the abandoned town of Cinnabar, Montana a few miles north of Gardiner. By the early 1960s, Merton moved the business into a more permanent structure, its present location at 202 S. 2nd Street, next to the old store, sharing the building with the U.S. Forest Service offices in Gardiner.

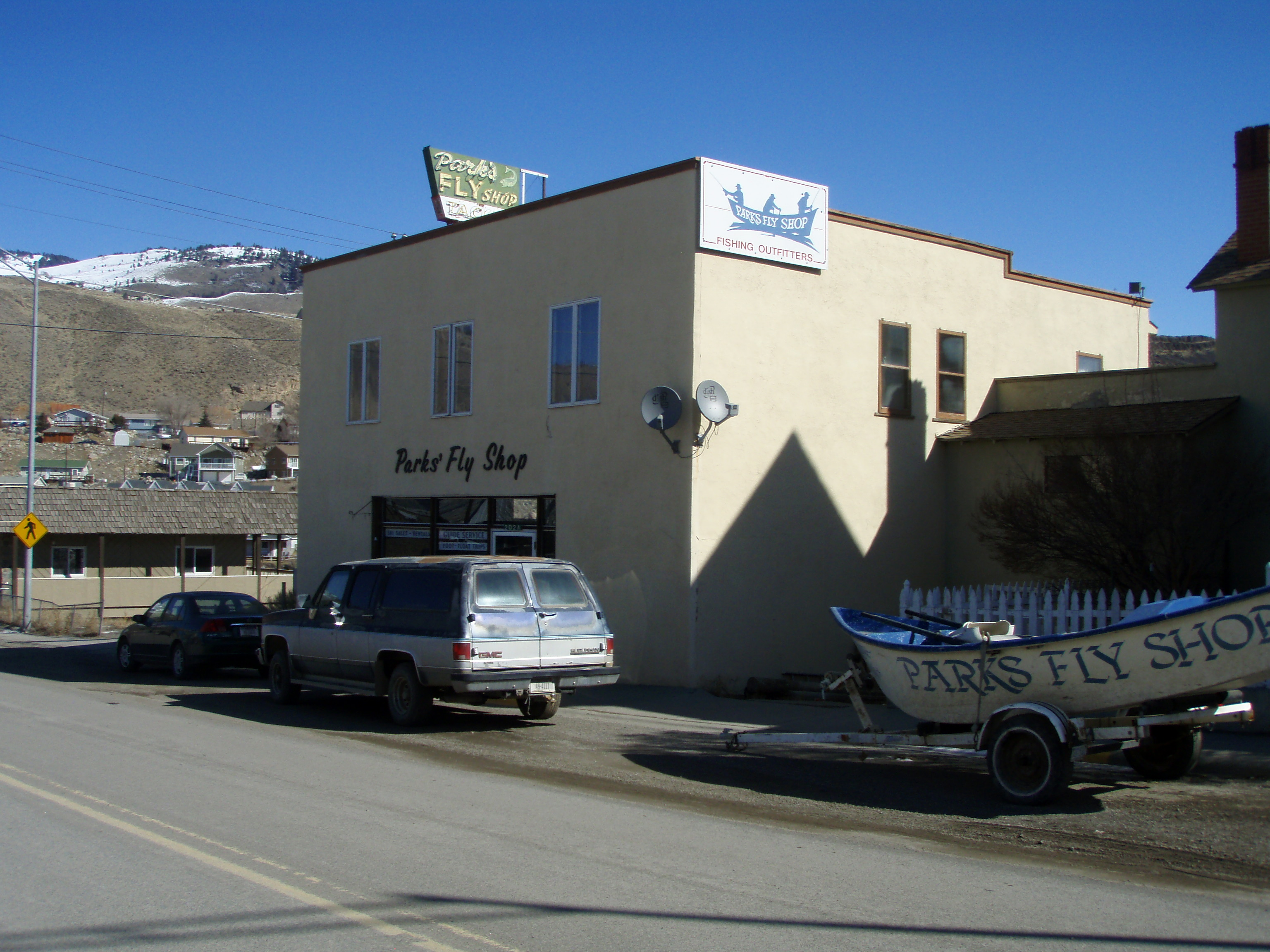
Parks' Fly Shop

The fly shop was one of the first in the region to offer guided float fishing on the Yellowstone River. In 1955, Merton guided his first float clients in a war surplus rubber raft, but quickly transitioned to wooden rowboats and eventually aluminum johnboats. In 1978, Richard began using fiberglass drift boats or dories with his float clients. Although the fly shop has continued its mail order fly business to the present day, especially for locally produced custom flies, its mainstay was always and continues to be servicing local and visiting anglers on the Yellowstone River and Yellowstone National Park waters. Since its opening, flies and fly fishing tackle have changed significantly and Parks' Fly Shop helped its clients transition from bamboo fly rods, to fiberglass, to today's graphite rods. When the shop was opened, fly lines were made of silk and leaders of silkworm gut. Flies were tied with fur, feathers, yarn and floss. Today's flies are innovative combinations of fur, feathers and a myriad of synthetic materials.

Merton's son, Richard, grew up in Gardiner and became an accomplished professional fly tyer and fly fishing guide while working for his father in the business. In 1966, Richard graduated from Montana State University with a B.A. in History. After college, Richard spent three years in the U.S. Army as a Landing Craft Coxswain serving in Virginia and South Vietnam. After his military service, Richard pursued a graduate degree, but economics kept him from completing it while he ran the fly shop in Gardiner. After Merton died in 1970, the fly shop remained with Merton's wife until 1985, when Richard assumed ownership of the business. He still operates it today.

== Contributions to Montana and Yellowstone angling ==
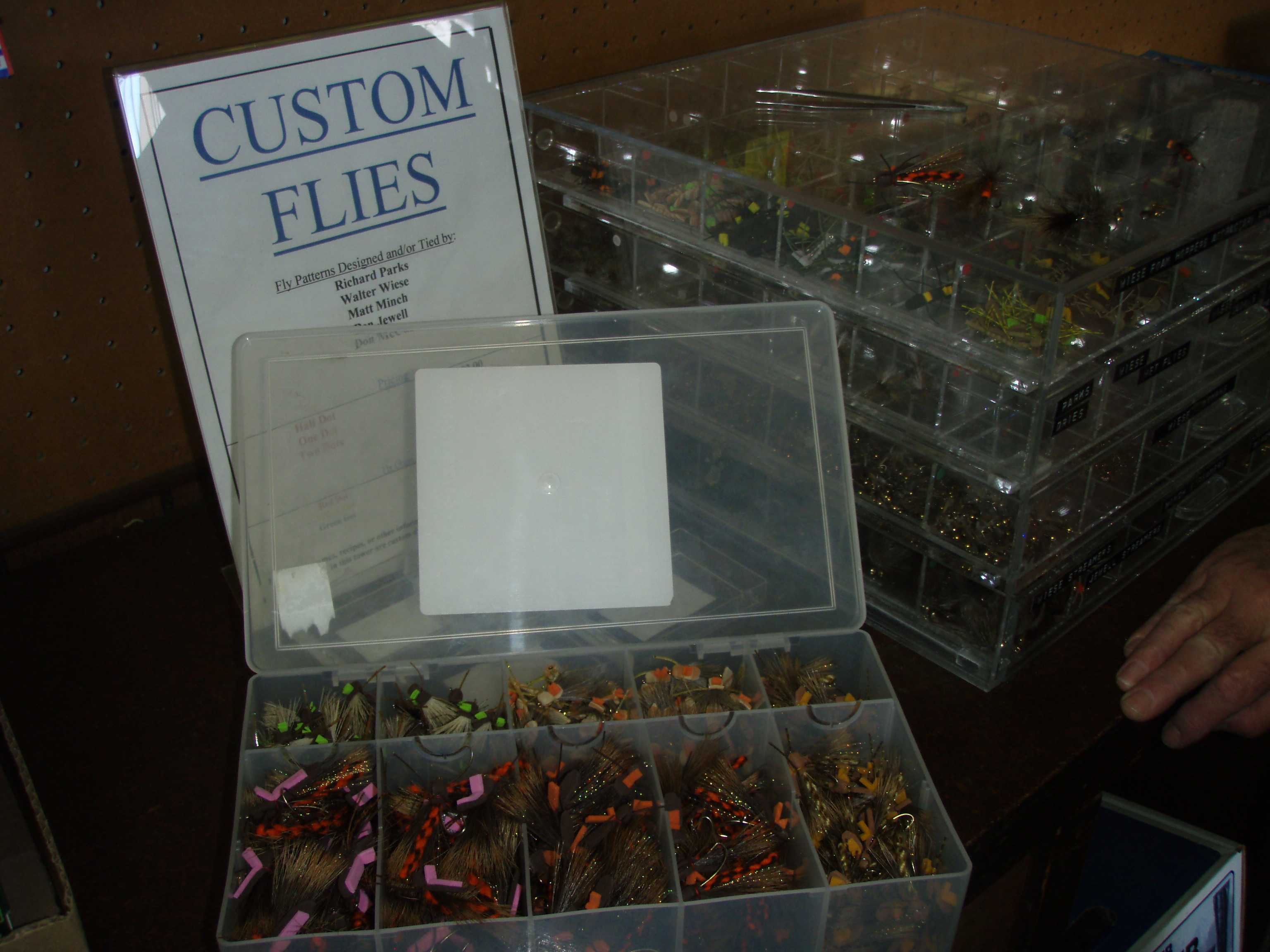
Custom Flies

One of the most enduring contributions of Parks' Fly Shop is the Parks' Salmon Fly, an improved version of the old Sofa Pillow used to imitate the giant stoneflies or Salmon Flies on the Yellowstone River and its tributaries. In 1954, Merton Parks found the older imitations of the giant stonefly unsuitable and created the Parks Salmon Fly. The fly remains popular and in use still today. Charles Brooks, a master Yellowstone fly fisherman, called the Parks' Salmon Fly one of his top three stonefly imitations. Today, Parks' Fly Shop is known locally for many innovative custom fly designs by tiers Walter Wiese and Matt Minch.,

Proximity to Yellowstone National Park provided Merton and Richard an enormous opportunity to become experts on Yellowstone waters. In 1998, Richard compiled this expertise into his second book--Fishing Yellowstone National Park—which is still in print and in its 3rd edition.

In 1980, Richard Parks help found the Fishing Outfitters Association of Montana to help service the collective needs of fly fishing outfitters throughout the state and help protect Montana's fish and habitats through its conservation fund.

== Environmental interests ==
Merton Parks, along with Dan Bailey of Livingston, Montana and Bud Lilly of West Yellowstone, Montana were instrumental in establishing the first Montana chapter--Joe Brooks Chapter—of Trout Unlimited in Livingston. Richard remains an active member of the chapter today and is a member of the Federation of Fly Fishers.

Richard Parks has been a long-standing member of the Northern Plains Resource Council, an organization dedicated to the protection of Montana's water quality, family farms and ranches, and it quality of life. He served as the council's Chairman from 1991–93,. In 1983, Parks Fly Shop and Richard Parks became charter members of the Bear Creek Council, an affiliate of the Northern Plains Resource Council in an effort to generate grass-roots support for reform of the General Mining Act of 1872. In May 1990, Richard received the Conservation Activist Award from the Greater Yellowstone Coalition for his work on the New World Gold Mine issue.

== See also ==
Angling in Yellowstone National Park
