= Muddler Minnow =

Fly fishing pattern

- Artificial fly
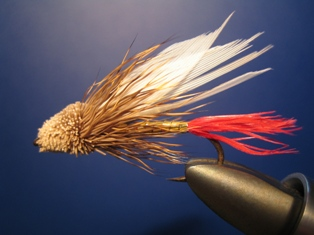
- Typical Muddler Minnow pattern
- Imitates: Baitfish, Sculpin

History
- Creator: Don Gapen
- Created: 1937
- Variations: Marabou muddlers

Materials
- Typical sizes: 2-12 3X-4X long
- Thread: 6/0 nylon brown
- Tail: Mottled turkey quill
- Body: Gold tinsel
- Wing: Gray squirrel (underwing), mottled turkey quill (overwing)
- Head: Spun natural deer hair

Reference(s)
- Pattern references: Trout Flies-The Tier's Reference (1999) Hughes

The Muddler Minnow is an artificial fly of the streamer type used in fly fishing and fly tying.

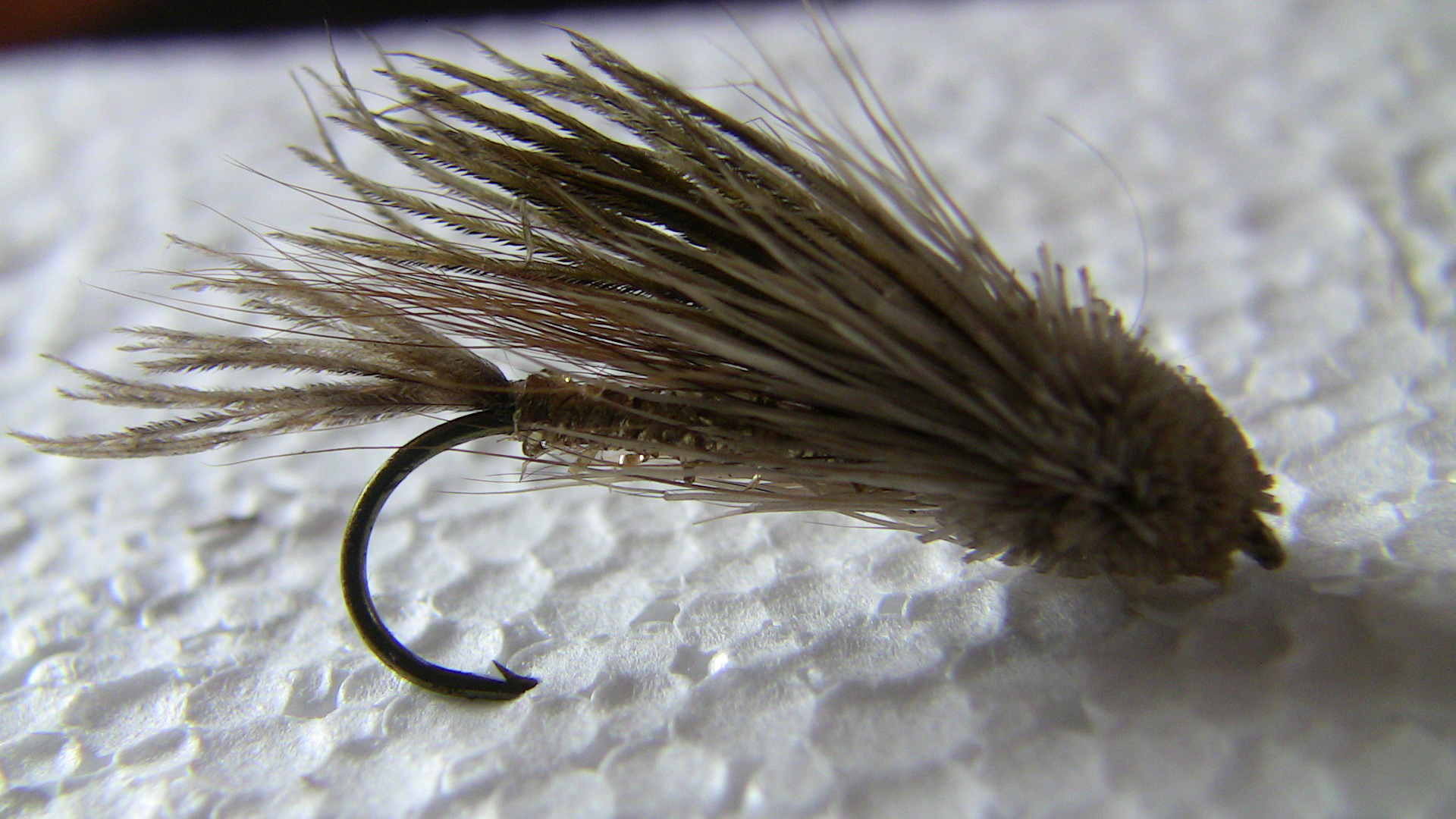
Muddler minnow fly

== Origin ==
The Muddler Minnow was originated by Don Gapen of Anoka, Minnesota, in 1936, to imitate the slimy sculpin and fool large brook trout in the Nipigon River. Gapen tied the fly by lantern light in his camp, using materials available in his portable kit, after watching First Nations guides capture sculpins and explain to him their importance as forage for the large, piscivorous trout in the Nipigon. Gapen was the son of resort operators Jesse and Sue Gapen, who in the 1920s ran the Gateway Lodge Resort on Hungry Jack Lake in what is now the Boundary Waters Canoe Area Wilderness. In 1936, the Gapens opened a second resort, the Chalet Bungalow Lodge, on the Nipigon River in Ontario to be operated by Don. In 1937 Gapen developed this fly to catch Nipigon strain brook trout, Ontario, Canada. The Muddler, as it is informally known by anglers, was popularized by Montana, United States fisherman and fly tier Dan Bailey. It is now a popular pattern worldwide and is likely found in nearly every angler's fly box, in one form or another. On March 14, 2008, a size 4 muddler minnow was used by Dr. Brian Yamamoto of Fairbanks, Alaska, to catch a 41.66-lb., 46 inch-long brown trout in Argentina's Rio Grande.

== Imitations ==
The versatility of the Muddler Minnow stems from this pattern's ability to mimic a variety of aquatic and terrestrial forage, ranging from sculpins, to crayfish to leeches, to grasshoppers, crickets, spent mayflies, emerging green drakes, stonefly nymphs, mice, tadpoles, dace, shiners, chubs, and other "minnows," along with a host of other creatures. Its mottled appearance matches many terrestrial and aquatic lifeforms, enabling it to mimic without imitating.

== Construction ==
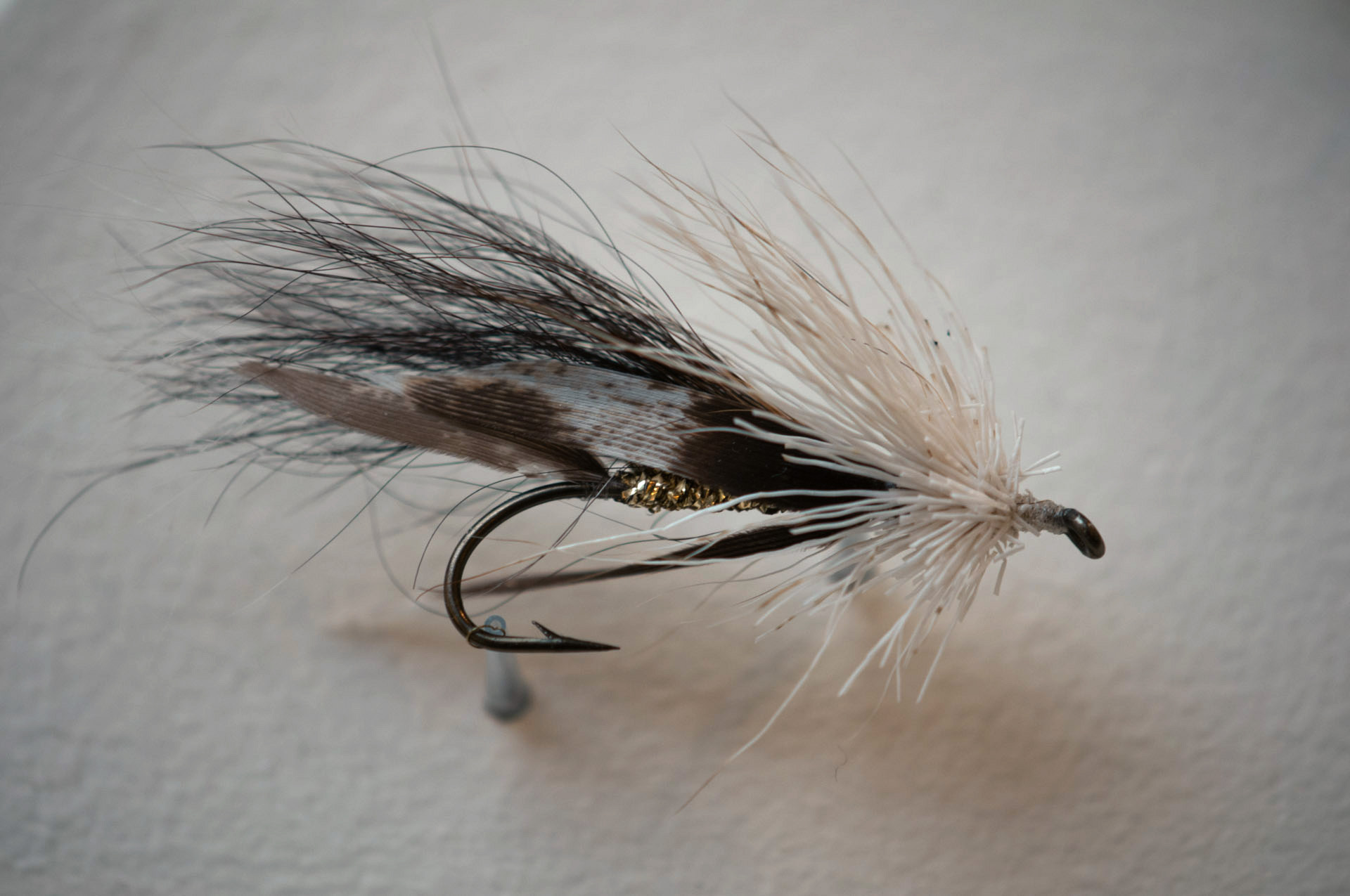
A Muddler Minnow fishing fly tied by Don Gapen, the originator of the pattern

There are limitless material and colour variations, however the essence of the Muddler Minnow is a spun deer hair head. While each Muddler may differ in colour or profile, all true Muddlers have a fore-end or body of spun deer hair that is clipped close to the shank to provide a buoyant head. Typically there is an underwing of squirrel hair and a wing of mottled secondary turkey feather. Often the fly body is made of gold/silver Mylar or tinsel wrapped around the hook shank. Marabou may be tied in as a substitute wing for colour and lifelike movement through the water. The head may be weighted or unweighted, according to the style of fishing, the target species and the intended imitation. The muddler has served for the basis of several patterns, including the Spuddler, Muddler Hopper, Mizzoulian Spook, Searcy Muddler, Keel Muddler, and so on, but even in its simplest and original form, it remains a very effective fly.

Besides the traditional deer hair, many Muddlers are tied today with heads made of antelope, spun wool, dubbing, chenille, or other materials. Whether they should properly be called Muddlers is a moot point.

Note that the fly pictured in the top of the article, while typical, is not a traditional Muddler Minnow. The traditional Muddler uses brown mottled turkey quill segments for both tail and wing. It also seems to lack the underwing of gray squirrel tail. As originally tied by Don Gapen (and as still tied by The Gapen Company today), the Muddler Minnow's head was sparse and "raggedy," the head and collar being fashioned from a single clump of deer hair. The dense head featured on most of today's Muddlers was the invention of Dan Bailey, ca. 1950, because Muddlers were mainly used to imitate large grasshoppers out West back in the 1950s,

== Target species ==
Muddler patterns are generally effective when fishing for any freshwater or saltwater species in cold or warm water environments. This pattern is most often used to catch all species of trout, steelhead, Arctic char, large grayling, both Atlantic and Pacific salmon, taimen, lenok, smallmouth and largemouth bass, pike, redfish (red drum), tarpon, and almost anything else that swims.

== Fishing the Muddler ==
Effective retrieval tactics include stripping the floating Muddler across the water surface rhythmically, imparting a "wake", or allowing the Muddler to sink and twitching or pulsating it against or across a river's current. An unweighted Muddler will float and appears as a hopper, moth or struggling mouse. With a tiny piece of split shot in front of it (or an intermediate flyline) the Muddler can be made to swim slowly over weedbeds and shallow gravel bars. With more weight, the Muddler can be stripped wildly in the shallows to imitate and alarmed baitfish, or allowed to settle in deeper water. When weighted—either on the fly itself, with split shot, or a sinking leader or line—the Muddler may be fished right on the bottom to effectively imitate a sculpin. When imitating sculpins, Muddlers must be kept right on the bottom and fished slowly, with occasional fast strips of maybe a foot to a yard, as if trying to escape a predator.

Tied on salmon hooks ranging from sizes 2 to 10, the Muddler—along with variations such as the Marabou Muddler—is commonly used for Atlantic salmon. It may be fished on the swing in the manner of a traditional salmon wet fly, or presented in the surface film as a waking fly. Anglers sometimes use the Portland Creek riffle hitch to enhance the waking action, though it is not required. Muddlers tied on salmon double hooks are often considered effective for waking presentations. Salmon may follow a waking fly for some distance and strike only near the end of the drift, so allowing the Muddler to pause and wobble in the current before recasting can be beneficial. This approach is also used when targeting trout, including larger individuals.
