= Fly tying =

Process of producing artificial flies used in fly fishing

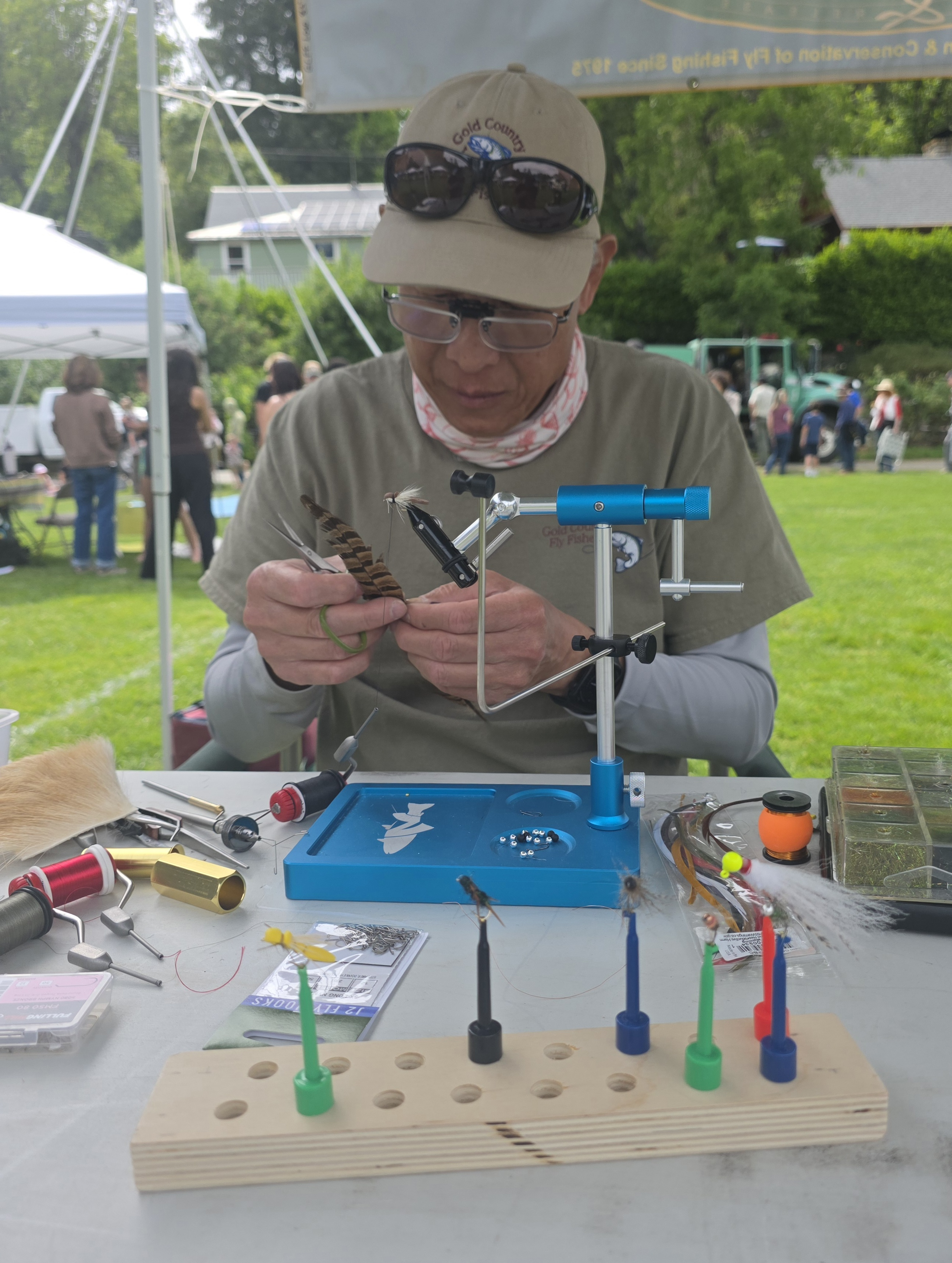
Fly tying demonstration in 2026

Fly tying (also historically referred to in England as dressing flies) is the process of producing an artificial fly used by fly fishing anglers to catch fish. Fly tying is a manual process done by a single individual using hand tools and a variety of natural and manmade materials that are attached to a hook. Although the recent history of fly tying dates from the middle 1800s, fly tyers have been engaged in tying flies since at least 200 AD.

Helen Shaw, an American professional fly tyer, defined fly tying as the "simple process of binding various materials to a hook with thread". Fly tying is a practical art form that many individuals are able to practice with reasonable success and tie flies which produce results when fly fishing. It is also a hobby that benefits from the fly tyer's knowledge of the insects and other food sources that fish consume in the wild.

Fly tying requires some basic equipment; a vise to hold the hook, a bobbin to dispense and provide tension on thread, scissors, pliers and the appropriate materials for the particular fly pattern selected. These materials consists mostly of feathers, fur/animal hairs, threads, and various synthetic materials.

Fly tying equipment enables the fly tyer to efficiently and effectively assemble and secure the materials on the hook to produce a particular type of fly. Fly tying materials were originally limited to various furs, feathers, threads and hooks. Since the mid-1900s, many more natural and synthetic materials are available to use to tie flies.

Fly patterns are the instructions or recipes required to create the fly. They specify hook sizes and types, the materials and colors to be used, as well as the sequence to be followed and the assembly methods. There are thousands of possible fly patterns available to the tyer.

== Approach ==
Some view fly tying as an art form. E. C. Gregg, in his 1940 publication, stated that "The object of this book will be throughout its entirety to teach in a practical manner the Art of Fly Tying in all its branches."

In contrast, A. K. Best suggests practical ways to streamline the tying technique. Best emphasizes that fly tying is not only a handicraft but also a science rooted in carefully observing fish and their prey, and then designing and tying artificial flies to replicate that prey in order to catch fish. One of the first contributions to this approach was made by Preston Jennings in his A Book of Trout Flies.

== History ==
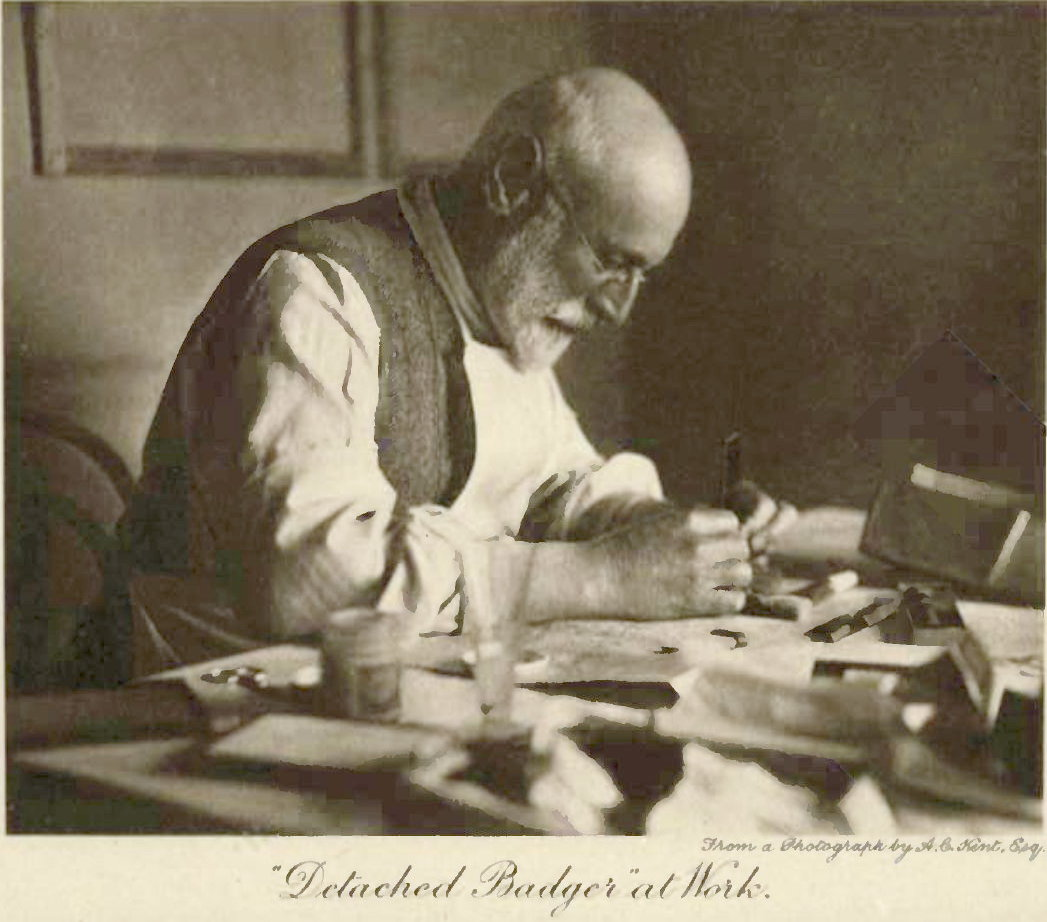
Frederic M. Halford, 19th-century English fly tyer

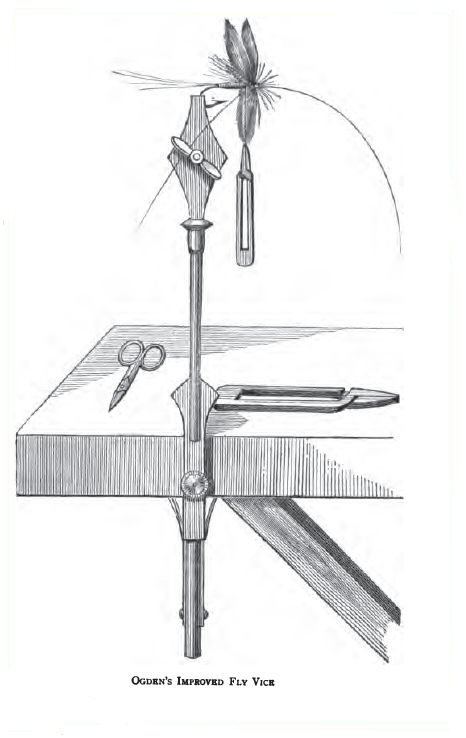
Ogden's improved fly vise (1887)

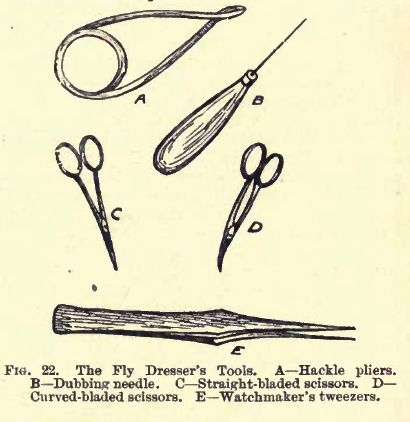
The fly dresser's tools from The Trout Fly Dresser's Cabinet of Devices or How To Tie Flies for Trout and Grayling Fishing (1919)

The history of fly tying (and fly design) reflects the evolution and history of fly fishing. Basic fly-tying methods have not changed dramatically from the mid-19th century to the present. Most changes resulted from the introduction and adaptation of new materials, especially synthetics, and new hook designs. Images from the early literature devoted to fly tying and fly construction do not show processes significantly different from those used today. The tools associated with fly tying today have, however, evolved along with new technologies. In the mid-19th century flies were tied without benefit of a hook vise. Instead, the hook was held by the fingers as the fly was constructed. The following is from Rod Fishing in Clear Waters (London 1860):

Your materials being now in a state of readiness, the hook must be first tied on with waxed silk to the finest end of the hair or gut left after cutting off the curled end, in this manner (Plate vii. No. 1): Take the bend of the hook between your left finger and thumb, the shank projecting; place an end of the waxed silk, which should be about six inches in length, and the end of the gut along the underside of the shank; pass the silk over until you have wrapped it down to the end of the shank, and two or three turns back for the head of the fly; take the feather or hackle as prepared (Plate vii. No. 2), put the point of the feather from where it is turned back with the outside next the hook, and hold it there with your left finger and thumb until you pass the silk over it, just where you left off, wrapping it twice or thrice on its downward rounds to the bend of the hook; take your scissors and cut off the root of the feather, and the superfluous gut under the bend of the hook, leaving it not quite so long as the body of the fly has to be made; take the thick end of your feather in your tweezers or pliers and wrap it over three or four times close together, following the silk wrappings until it is all, or as much as you deem sufficient, twirled on; then take your silk and pass over the end once or twice; cut off the superfluous part of the feather and wrap up the shank with the silk, evenly and regularly, to form the body of the fly, and fasten off by a loop-knot or two; or, if you want a thick-bodied fly or one of flossed silk, turn down again and fasten off at the shoulder; cut off the silk left, set the feather right with your needle and finger and thumb, and the fly is made or dressed. This is the simplest method.

— Henry Wade, 1860

One of the earliest references to the use of a fly-tying vise is in Ogden on Fly Tying (London, 1887). Other fly-tying tools—scissors, hackle pliers, tweezers, bodkins, etc.—have remained remarkably similar since the late 1800s.

== Purpose ==
Tying artificial flies has always been about imitating some form of fish prey. Significant literature on the concepts of imitation exists especially for trout flies. A Book of Trout Flies – Jennings (1935), Streamside Guide to Naturals & Their Imitations – Art Flick (1947), Matching the Hatch.. Schweibert (1955), Selective Trout - Swisher and Richards (1971), Nymphs - Schweibert (1973), Caddisflies - LaFontaine (1989), Prey - Richards (1995) are a few 20th-century titles that deal extensively with imitating natural prey. From a human perspective, many fly patterns do not exactly imitate fish prey found in nature, but they are nevertheless successful. A successful or "killing" fly pattern imitates something that the target species preys on. This has resulted in fly tyers and fishers devising additional terms to characterize those flies that obviously do not imitate anything in particular, yet are nevertheless successful at catching fish. These additional terms are inconsistently but commonly associated with trout-fly patterns because of their huge variety, both historical and contemporary. The term Attractor pattern has been applied to flies which resemble nothing in particular but are successful in attracting strikes from fish. Dick Stewart characterizes these same patterns as "General Purpose". Dave Hughes describes the same flies as Searching flies and characterizes three levels of imitation: Impressionistic, Suggestive and Imitative.

Paul Schullery explains that although much has been written about imitation theories of fly design, all successful fly patterns must imitate something to attract the fish to strike. The huge range of fly patterns documented today for all sorts of target species—trout, salmon, bass and panfish, pike, saltwater, tropical exotics, etc.—are not easily categorized as merely imitative, attractors, searching or impressionistic.

== Tools and materials ==
=== Tools ===
Fly tying workbench

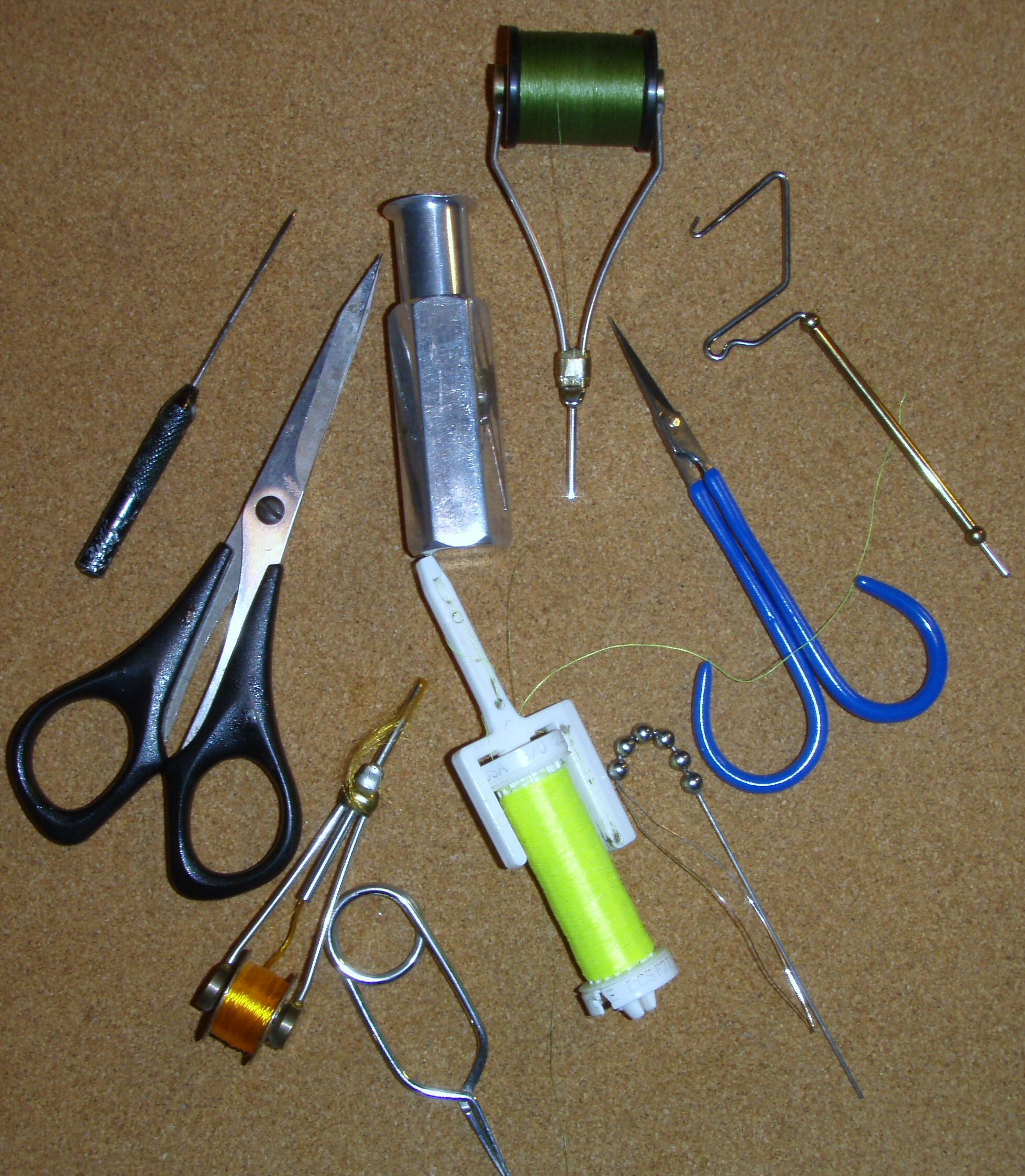
Illustrative selection of modern fly tying tools

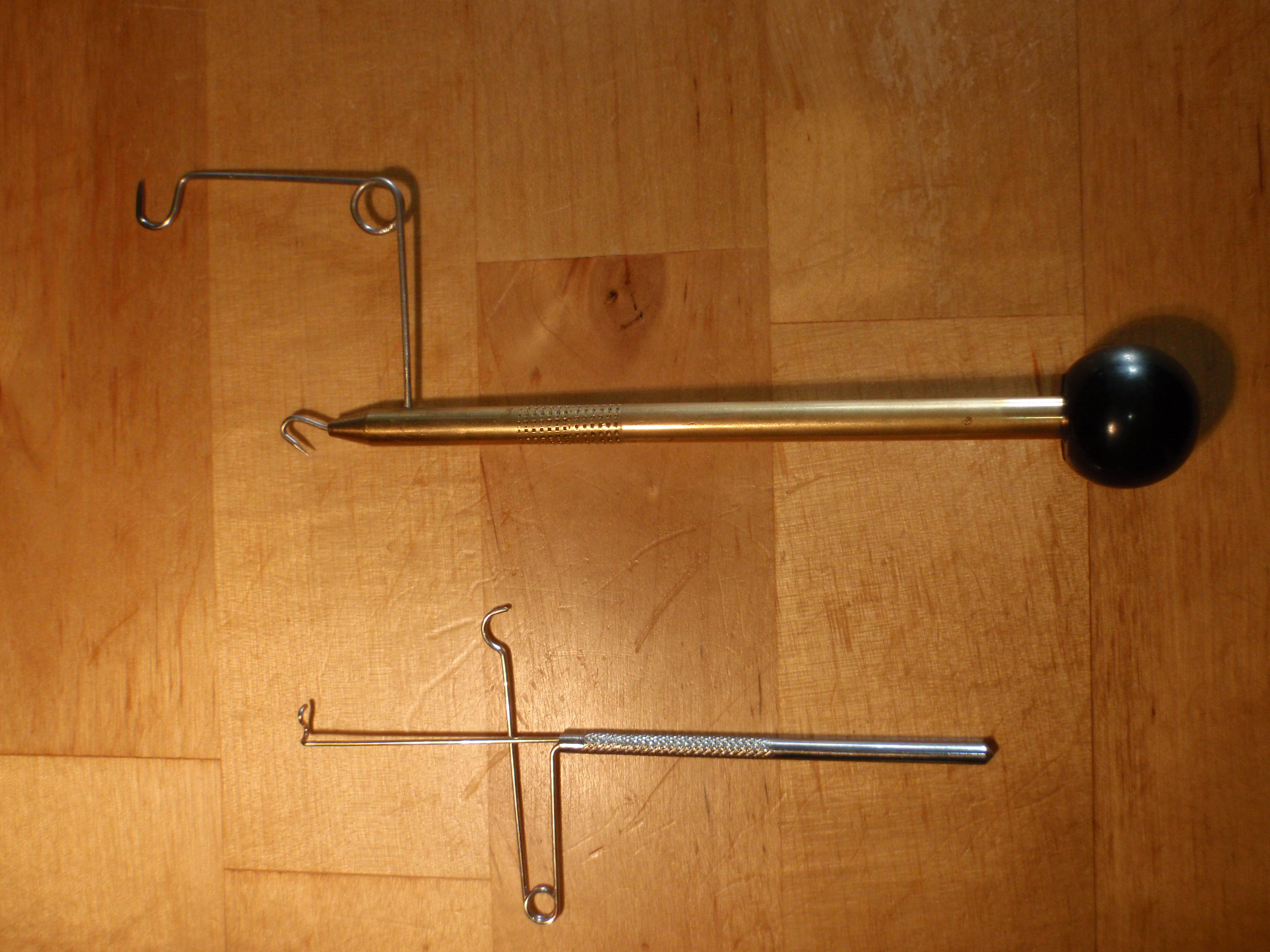
Whip finisher

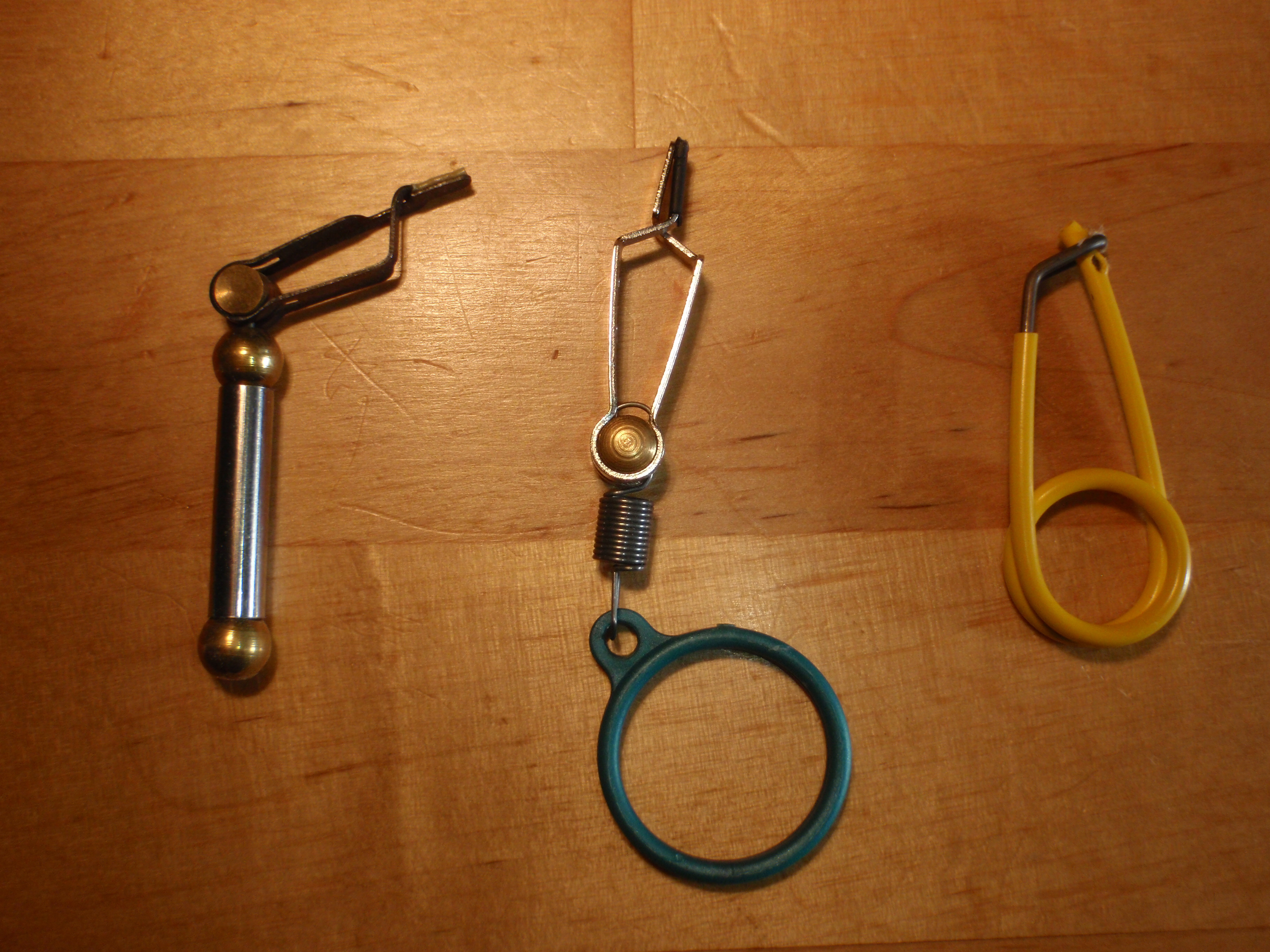
Hackle plyers

Various tools enable and optimize fly tying. Skip Morris, a professional fly tyer, lists the essential tools as being a vise to hold the hook of the fly to be tied, bobbin holders, hackle pliers, hackle gauges, work lights and magnifying glass to better see the fly as it is tied, hair stackers, scissors and tweezers. Other optional tools are pliers, toothpicks, bodkins, dubbing twisters, blenders, floss bobbin holders, whip finishers, wing burners and bobbin threaders.

- Vises: Vises are used to hold the hook when tying on materials. They come in various forms and may be clamped to a table or come with their own stand. The vise has a jaw used to hold the hook. On some vises, the jaws will rotate to assist in wrapping material on the hook in a uniform manner. The size of the jaw on some vises may be larger than others to hold a larger hook necessary for some flies, such as Musky flies. Vises also might have attached holders for material or for thread when rotating the vise. It is possible to tie a fly without a vise, called in-hand tying; however, this is more challenging and requires more manual dexterity and planning.
- Bobbin holder: The bobbin holder, commonly referred to as just "bobbin", is used to hold the thread bobbin when wrapping thread around the hook. The bobbin holder provides tension so that it can be released when the fly tyer is performing other tasks, such as wrapping hackle.
- Hackle plyers and gauges: Hackle plyers are used to hold the end of a hackle when wrapping the hackle onto the hook. Hackle gauges are used to select hackle for given size hook and to measure hook sizes.
- Hair stackers: Hair stackers are concentric tubes of different diameter with one tube having a bottom. This allows the fly tyer to stack hair so that the ends are aligned at one end before being applied to the hook. The stacker is usually made of a heavy metal like brass. The bottom of the stacker with hair inserted is pounded on a table a couple of times to help in aligning the hairs before they are pulled out of the stacker while in a horizontal position.
- Scissors and Tweezers: Small pointed and sharp tying scissors are used to cut fly tying material. A second set of scissors or plyers are used for cutting wire and heavy materials that would easily dull the tying scissors. Tweezers are used pick up or hold materials like beads that applied to the hook.
- Whip finishers: A whip finisher is a tool for tying the thread around the hook that secures the thread in place.
- Dubbing and dubbing twister: Dubbing is made of hair or synthetic material that is ground up and applied to the outside of thread. The dubbing can be fine for small dry flies or coarse. Sometimes, dubbing wax is used in moderation to assist in applying the dubbing fibers to the thread. The dubbing adds color and bulk to the fly and sometimes gives it a buggy look with coarse dubbing. A dubbing twister is used to apply dubbing to two strands of thread. It has a handle and two wires to hold the thread loop apart. The dubbing is applied between the two strands of thread and the twister is spun to twist the thread and dubbing together.

=== Materials ===
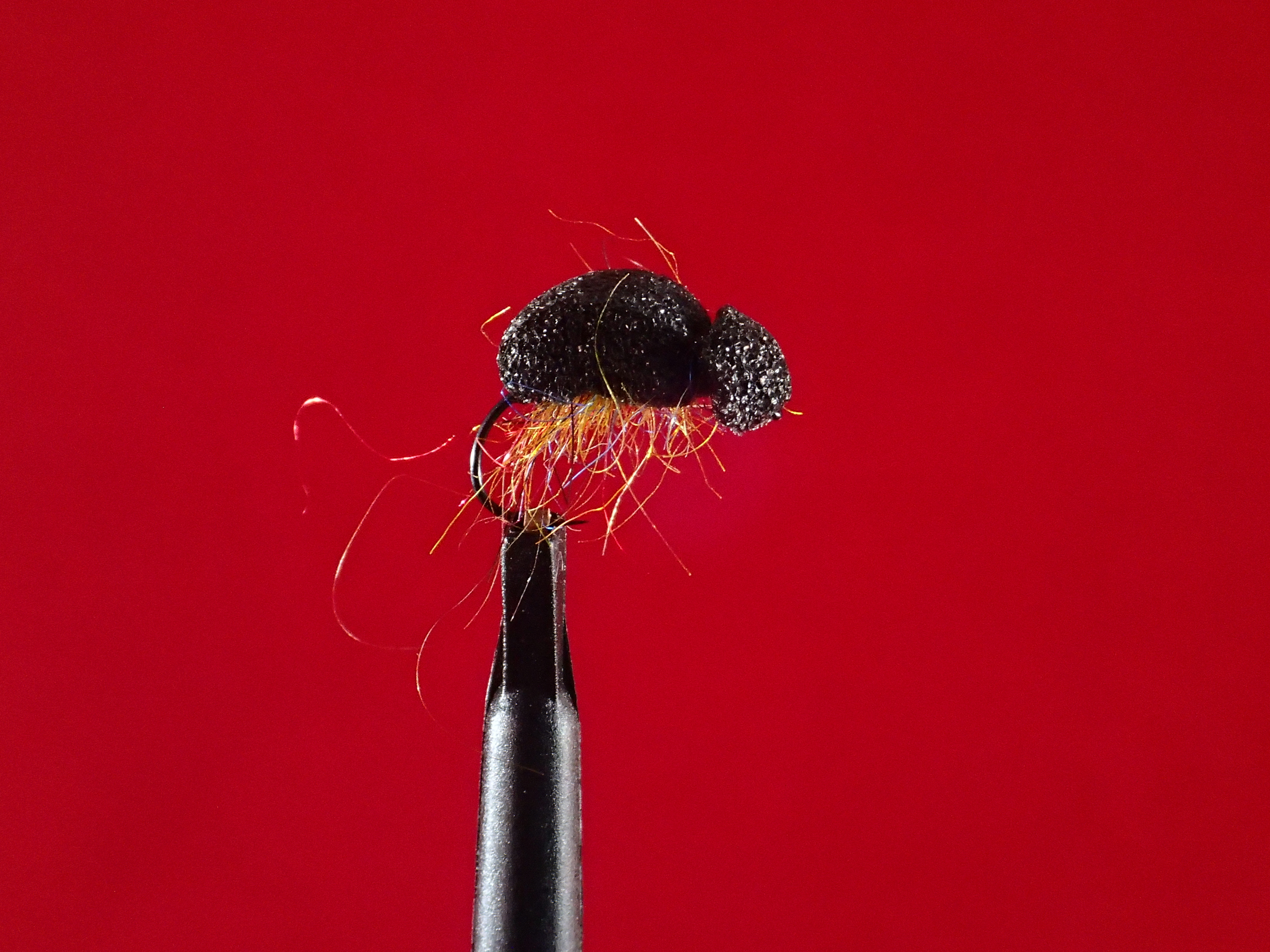
Foam Beetle with buggy dubbing

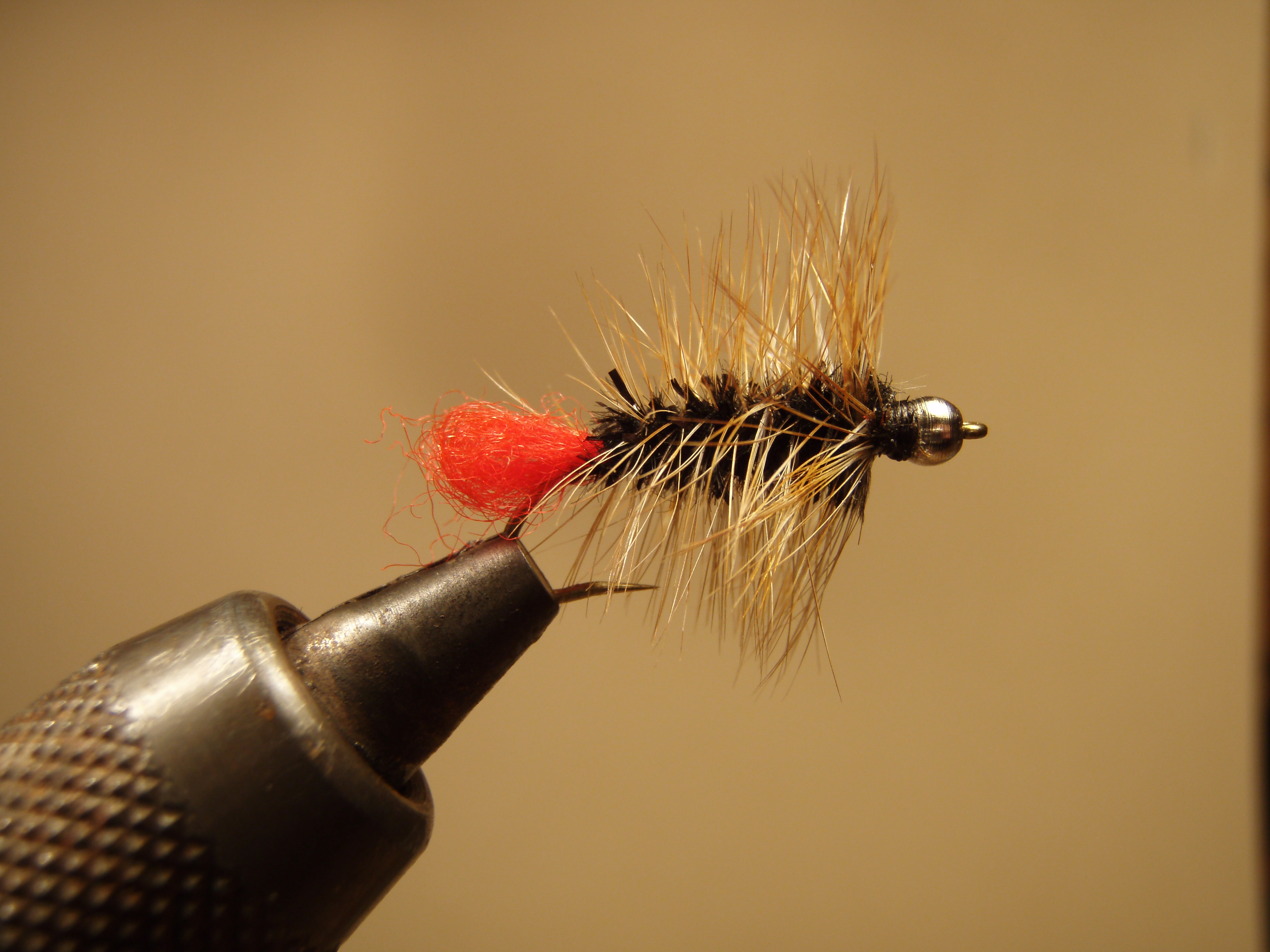
Black and Brown Wooly Worm with bead head

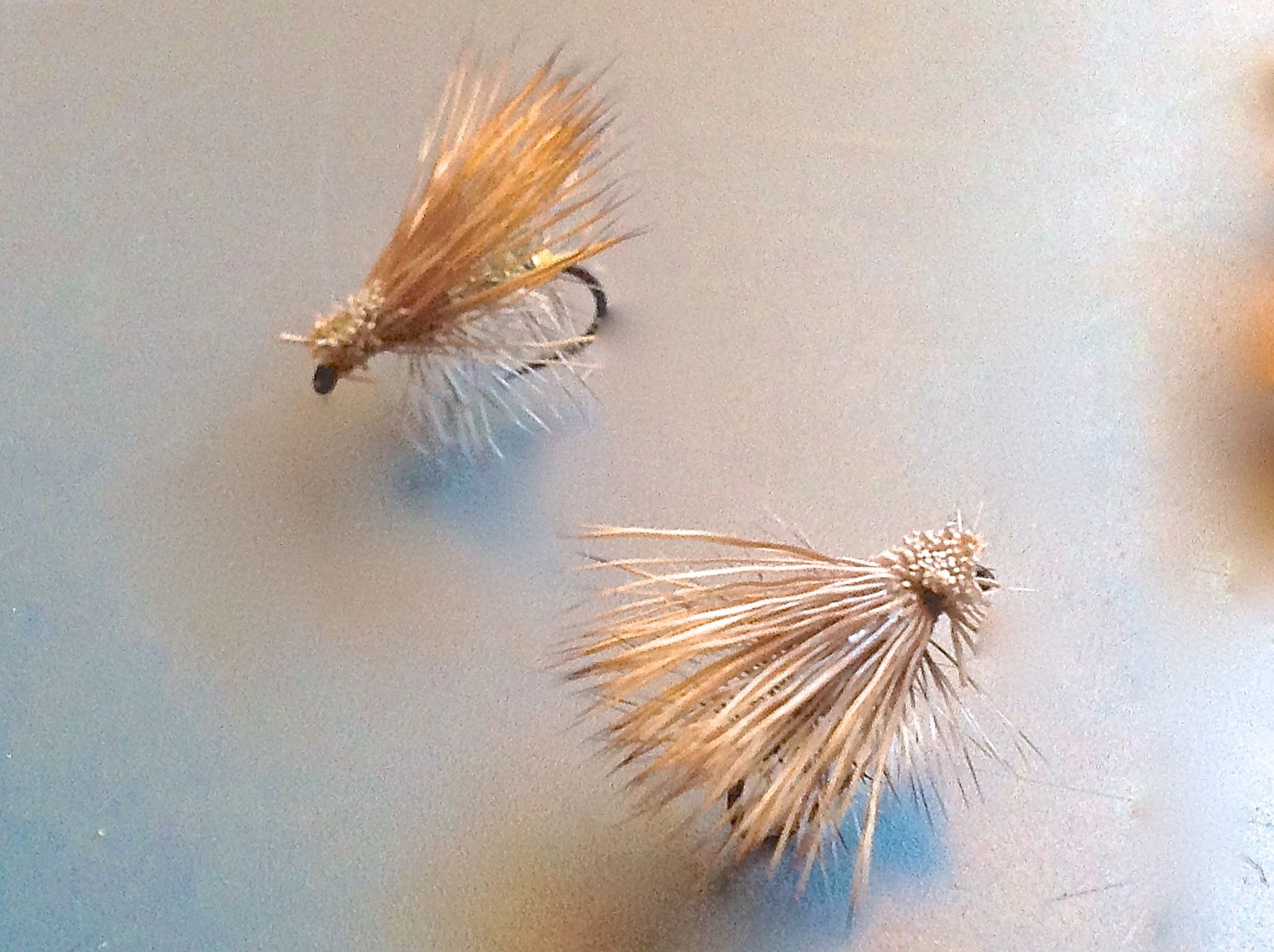
Elk Hair Caddis

Fly tying material can be anything used to construct a fly on a hook. Traditional materials were threads, yarns, furs, feathers, hair, tinsels, cork, balsa and wire. Today's materials include not only all sorts of natural and dyed furs, hair and feathers, but also a wide array of synthetic materials. Rabbit, mink, muskrat, fox, bear, squirrel, deer, elk, and moose hair and other furs are commonly incorporated into artificial flies. Synthetics have allowed fly tyers to replicate rare and sometimes endangered furs and feathers as well as create completely new types of flies. Synthetics such as rubber legs, foam bodies, plastic wings, transparent plastic cords, chenilles, and all sorts and colors of flashy materials that can be incorporated into the wings and bodies of today's artificial fly are available to the fly tyer. Whereas lead wire (11.34 gm/cm3) was the traditional method of weighting flies, today's weighting materials include beads, cone heads, and lead-free wire (made from a nontoxic heavy alloy). Silicone, epoxy, kevlar materials are regularly incorporated into modern artificial fly patterns.

- Hooks: The hook determines the basic size and shape of each fly and is generally an important part of any fly pattern description. Hooks come in a wide range of size, shape, length and weight, and must be selected to complement the pattern being tied and the method by which it will be fished. Hook sizes are measured with a number that gives the size of the hook gape. The smallest fly hook starts are in the range #32 to #24 (rarely used by most fly tyers and anglers), followed by #22, #20, #18, #16, #14, #12, #10, #8, #6, #5, #4, #3, #2, #1, #1/0, #2/0, #3/0, #4/0, #5/0, #6/0, #7/0, #8/0 and #9/0. (Missing odd numbers are not used for smaller hooks.) The hook size relates to the size of the gape of the hook. The length of the hook is designated as 1X, 2X, 3X, etc., which is the length of the hook in terms of multiples of the gape. Hooks are made of wire. The wire is lighter for dry fly hooks to help the fly float better. Flies constructed for use in salt water are typically tied on corrosion-resistant hooks. The various manufactures use different numbering schemes to further define the shape of the hook, eye of the hook, and fly type (dry, nymph, stream, scud, Klinkhammer, etc.).
- Thread: Fly tying thread comes in a variety of colors and sizes. Most modern fly tying thread is made of nylon or polyester. Special use thread may be made of gel-spun polyethylene (GSP), Kevlar, silk, or even Monofilament fishing line. The size of the thread is measured in either denier or aughts. A denier weight specification states how many grams 9,000 meters of the thread weighs. Unlike the common thread weight system, the greater the denier number, the thicker the thread. The Wapsi Fly Company uses denier to specify the size of its UTC Ultra thread, which comes in 70, 140, 210, and 280 denier. Some thread manufacturers producing very fine silk threads used in fly tying (Danville Chenille Company and UNI Products), apply their own scales of thread measurement using "aughts" or zeroes. Within a given manufacturer's spectrum, a higher "aught count" indicates a finer thread: this is usually given as a single digit followed by a forward slash and a zero, e.g. 6/0, 8/0, and 10/0.
- Feathers/hackle/herl: The long feathers of the neck of poultry are referred to as hackle. Rooster/hen neck and saddle hackle, so essential for many artificial fly patterns, are from animals especially bred to produce hackles of superior performance, size and color. Hackle and feathers are sold individually or as a saddle, cape, wing, or tail section. Feathers from other birds are also used in fly tying, including coot, CDC, Duck, goose, grouse, guineafowl, jackdaw, bluejay, magpie, mallard, moorhen, partridge, pheasant, quail, snipe, starling, Eurasian teal, turkey, and woodcock. Peacock and ostrich feathers, called herl, are also used in fly thing. The soft, oily feathers from the back of a duck, called Cul de canard (CDC), are very buoyant and often used in dry flies.
- Beads: Beads are used as a head for weight in wet fly patterns. They have a hole drilled through the center of the bead and are applied onto the hook and pushed up to behind the eye. Slotted holes are also available for jig head hooks. Beads are sized to the hook and come in diameters of 1/16 (#18-#22), 5/64 (#16-#20), 3/32 (#14-#18), 7/64 (#12-#16), 1/8 (#10-#14), 5/32 (#8-#12), and 3/16 (#6-#10) inches. Weighted beads are made from either tungsten (19.3 gm/cm3), nickel (8.9 gm/cm3), or brass (8.4 to 8.73 g/cm3). Although the most common colors in patterns are gold, silver and brass, a wide variety of colors and textures are available.
- Biots: A biot is sturdy, tapered fiber from a goose or turkey wing feather. Commonly, it is used in fly patterns to imitate tails, wings, bodies, legs or antennae. Natural biots are white or brown but they are also dyed a variety of colors.

== Patterns ==
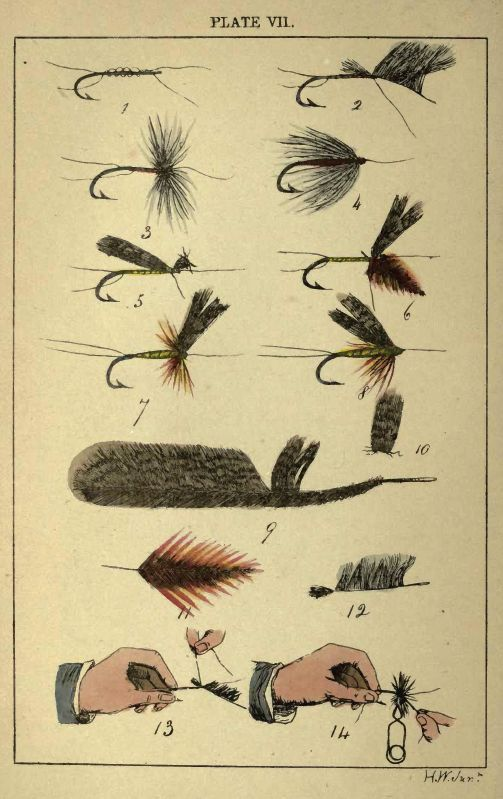
Early color plate showing fly tying steps (1860)

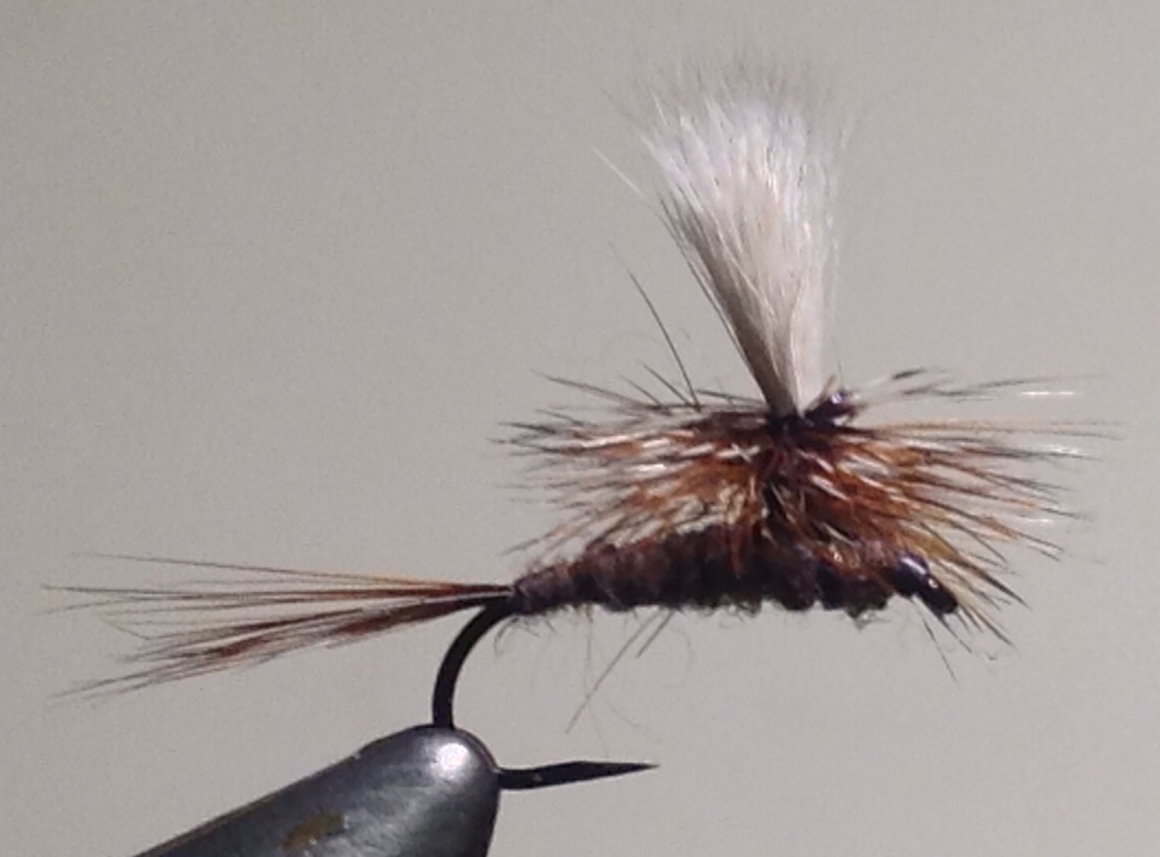
The Parachute Adams Dry Fly has a down eye and a parachute wing with hackle wound around the parachute.

The fly pattern is the recipe for any particularly named fly. In older literature, especially prior to the 20th century, fly patterns were referred to as dressings. The pattern specifies the size range and type of hook to be used, materials including type, color and size, and in some cases specific instructions on the order of application of materials and how to achieve a particular effect or configuration. Fly patterns allow tyers to consistently reproduce any given fly over time. A Light Cahill dry fly produced by one tyer will look remarkably similar to the same fly produced by a completely different tyer if the pattern is followed with reasonable accuracy and with comparable materials. Patterns may also lay out alternatives for different materials and variations.

Traditionally, fly patterns have been found in fly-fishing and fly-tying literature and periodicals. Although fly patterns do provide some consistency, different writers may publish patterns with small to moderate differences across pattern descriptions for the same fly. In many cases, greatest differences are in the tying technique rather than in the form, color or materials. Fly patterns may or may not have an image or drawing of the finished fly to guide the tyer. Historically, fly patterns have been included in texts that discuss fishing with a particular genre of fly, fly-fishing technique or fly-fishing for specific species or genre of gamefish. There are, however, texts that are pure fly pattern and tying references with little or no instruction on how to fish them.

The Internet has made available new avenues for fly tying instruction, especially with step by step illustrated instructions with tying recipes published on websites and YouTube videos. In-person fly tying instruction and observation is another valuable source for learning fly tying.

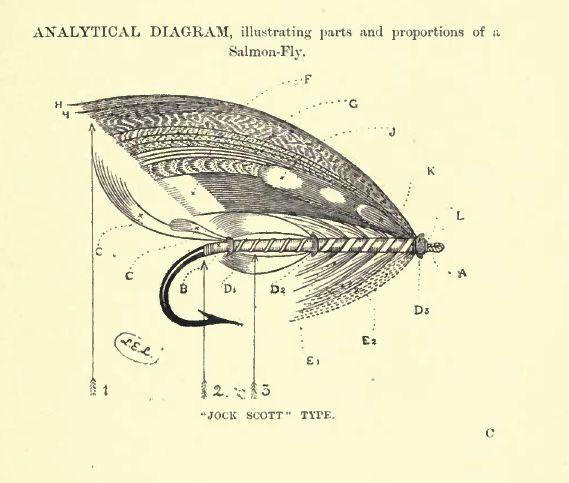
Typical parts of a Salmon Fly. The hook eye can be straight, sloped down, or sloped down and turned 90 degrees for a jig eye. * A – Tag * C – Tail * D – Butt * E – Hackle E2 – Throat Hackle * F – Under Wing * G – Over Wing * HH – Horn * J – Side * K – Cheek * L – Head

Salmon flies have historically been one of the most complex and elaborate artificial flies to tie. Texts describing fly tying techniques often use an image of a salmon fly to describe all the parts of an artificial fly.

The typical fly pattern appears something like one of the illustrative patterns below for the Adams dry fly (without tying instructions) or the Clouser Deep Minnow (with tying instructions). Based on the fly pattern, a knowledgeable fly tyer can reproduce the fly with the materials specified.

Typical fly pattern descriptions
Fly	Pattern
#10 Adams dry fly	Hook: Size #10–#18 standard dry-fly, e.g. Tiemco 100; Thread: gray 6/0; Wing: grizzly hen hackle tips; Tail: mixed grizzly and brown hackle fibers; Body: gray yarn or dubbing (fine dry fly dubbing); Hackle: brown and grizzly hackle sized to hook
Clouser Deep Minnow streamer	Hook: Size #2, #4, #6 or #8, Mustad 3366, For a saltwater fly, a tinned or stainless hook should be used.; Thread: white 3/0 or 6/0; Eyes: a 1/50 or 1/36-ounce metal dumbbell painted with vinyl jig paint; Belly: white bucktail; Flash: holographic silver Flashabou, silver Krystal Flash, pearlescent Flashabou, and pearlescent Krystal Flash. Use only four to six strands of each.; Back: gray bucktail topped with a little hair from the brown portion of the tail

Historically, fly pattern types have evolved along with fly fishing itself and today there are generally recognized pattern types. However, none are absolute, as there is much crossover in patterns and pattern types. Typically the fly tyer will encounter patterns classified as dry, wet, soft hackle (wet fly with hackle collar), emerger, nymph, scud (freshwater crustaceans), terrestrial (hoppers), streamer, salmon (Atlantic), Steelhead trout and Pacific salmon, bass, popper, panfish, Carp, saltwater, Northern pike, Bonefish, or musky fly patterns. Even within these categories, there can be many sub-categories of imitative and non-imitative fly patterns.

== Commercial market ==
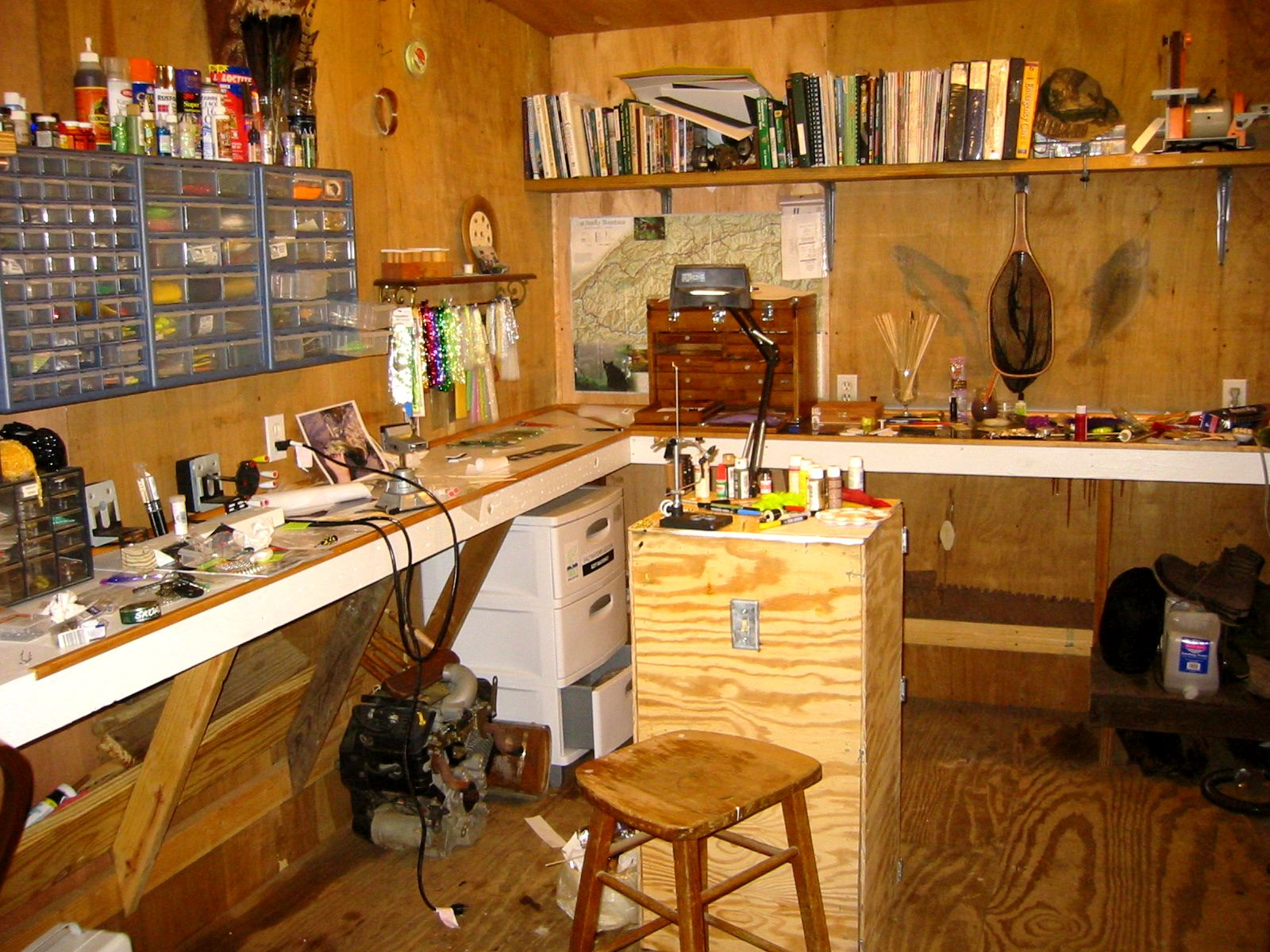
A production fly tyer's bench and materials

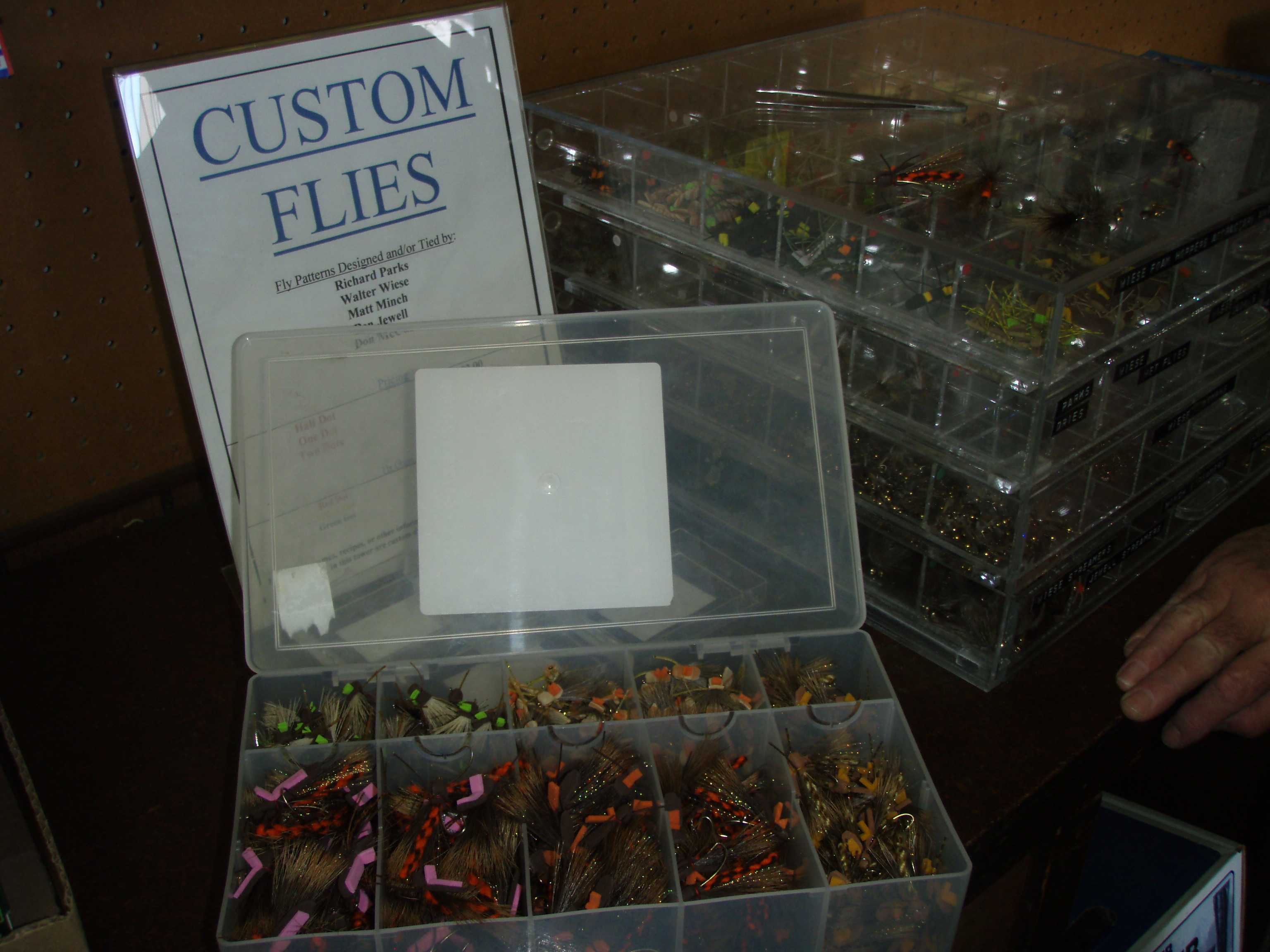
Custom flies for sale at Parks' Fly Shop in Gardner, Montana

Hand-tied flies on the commercial market sell for under a US dollar to several US dollars each. Fly tying serves as a hobby for some, a money-saving strategy for others, and a profitable commercial enterprise for the professional tyer. The professional or commercial fly tyer may produce upwards of 36 thousand flies annually, whereas the amateur fly tyer may tie only a few flies each season for personal use.

== Notable fly tyers ==
- Dan Bailey (American, 1904–1982, creator of Green Drake and other flies)
- Rosina Megan Boyd (English, 1915–2001, Salmon Flies)
- James Deren (American, –1983, created The Fifty Degrees and Deren's Fox Dry Fly)
- Jack Gartside (American, 1942–2009, fly tying author, angling known for his impressionistic style of tying)
- George F. Grant (American, 1906–2008, fly tying author and first to promote the importance of nymph patterns)
- Frederic M. Halford (English, 1844–1914)
- Bernard "Lefty" Kreh (American, 1925–2018, creator of Lefty's Deceiver)
- Don Martinez (American, 1903–1955, developed Woolly Worm (imitation)
- Louis Rhead (English, 1857–1926)
- Edwin Rist (American, known for stealing hundreds of birds to use their feathers in flies)
- Alfred Ronalds (English, 1802–1860)
- Frank Sawyer (1906–1980, created Pheasant Tail Nymph)
- Carrie G. Stevens, (American, 1882–1970, created Grey Ghost Streamer)
- Lee Wulff (American, 1905–1991, noted for his Wulff series of dry flies)

== See also ==
- American Museum of Fly Fishing
- Artificial fly
- Catskill Fly Fishing Center and Museum
- Feather
- Fish hook
- Fly fishing
- Fly Tyer (magazine)
- Japanese Flies
- List of poultry feathers
- Manufacturers of fly tying materials and tools
- Bibliography of fly fishing (fly tying, stories, fiction)
