= Manufacturers of fly tying materials and tools =

Manufacturers of fly tying materials and tools produce products specifically designed for tying artificial flies used in fly fishing. For the most part, the materials and tools from manufacturers are sold to fly tyers through fly fishing retail outlets, both brick and mortar and online stores that buy in bulk from the manufacturers. The manufacturing companies are headquartered primarily in the United States, United Kingdom, Japan, Italy, France, and China. The types of materials and tools that are produced include specialized fly tying hooks, metal and glass beads, feathers, thread, dubbing (animal or synthetic fibers used to coat threads), tinsel, wire, chenille, fly tying vises, tools to assist in manipulating materials, and a variety of other synthetic materials used in fly tying. Processing of animal hair and fur for fly tying, as well as hand tied flies is done on a smaller scale by independent companies or professional fly tyers.

== Manufacturers of fly tying materials ==
Only the largest and most notable manufacturing companies around the world are included in the table below. These tables do not include the plethora of small companies and individuals that sell small stocks of materials to retailers or retail stores. Almost all beads are made in China, where the supplies of tungsten and nickel are high. The catalogs of retailers have been used as references to identify notable manufacturers. The types of materials that the companies make, the location of the company headquarters, and year of founding are listed when known.

Manufacturers of fly tying materials
Manufacturer	Materials	Headquarters	Country	Founded	References
Ahrex	hooks		Denmark		
Allen Fly Fishing	Hooks	Southlake, Texas	US		
Au Ver a Soie	thread (silk)		France	1820	
Dai-Riki	hooks	Osaka	Japan	Out of business in 2019	
Daiichi	hooks	New York (headquarters)	US (headquarters), Japan (manufacturing)		
Danville Chenille Company	thread, chenille, tinsel, wire	Danville, New Hampshire	US		
Enrico Puglisi	sythentic fibers		US		
Firehole Outdoors (Dark Hills, LLC)	hooks, beads	Bozeman, Montana	US		
Fox Tails	hair and Fur		UK		
Fulling Mill	hooks	Claremont, New Hampshire/London/Kenya	US/UK/Kenya	1930s	
Gamakatsu PTE LTD	hooks	Osaka	Japan, Singapore	1955	
Guangxi Chentian Hengyuan Metal Product Co., Ltd.	beads	Guangxi	China		
Hanak	hooks		US		
Hareline Dubbin, LLC	dubbing and other materials	Monroe, Oregon	US		
Hends Hooks	hooks, dubbing		UK		
Kamasan	hooks		Japan		
Keough	feathers	Michigan	US		
Knapek	hooks		UK		
Kona	hooks		US		
Loon Outdoors	glues	Ashland, Oregon	US	1997	
Mouches de Charrette (JMC)	dubbing		France		
Nature's Spirit	dubbing, feathers, herl, beads		US		
O. Mustad & Son	hooks	Gjøvik	Norway	1832	
Partridge Hooks	hooks		UK	1800s	
Saber	hooks		US		
Semperfli	thread	North Yorkshire	UK		
Skalka Hooks	hooks		Czech Republic	1985	
Spirit River, Inc.	feathers, dubbing, beads		US		
Sprite Hooks	hooks		UK		
Swiss CDC	feathers		Switzerland		
Sybai	dubbing		UK		
TIEMCO, LTD (TMC)	hooks	Tokyo	Japan	1969	
Umpqua Feather Merchants (includes Metz)	feathers, hooks	Louisville, Kentucky	US	1972	
UNI-thread	thread		Canada, Spain		
Varivas	hooks		Japan		
Veevus	thread		Denmark		
Veniards	feathers, hair, wire		UK	1923	
Wahoo International	UV resins		US	1985	
Wapsi Fly Company	dubbing, feathers, hair	Mountain Home, Arkansas	US	1945	
Whiting Farms	feathers	Colorado	US	1989 (Thomas Whiting and Henry Hoffman)	

== Manufacturers of fly tying tools ==
The types of tools that the companies manufacture, the location of the company headquarters, and year of founding are listed when known. The products manufactured include fly tying vises, scissors, tweezers, bobbin holders, bodkins, and hair stackers. The following are the major manufacturers of tools used in fly tying:

Manufacturers of fly tying tools
Manufacturer	Product	Location	References
AAS Implex	scissors and forceps	Sialkot, Pakistan, founded in 1984	
Crown	vises	India	
Dr. Slick	tools	Belgrade, Montana, US, founded in 1989	
Dyna-King	vises	Cloverdale, California, US, founded in 1981	
Griffin Enterprises, Inc.	vises, bobbins	Kalispell, Montana, US	
HMH Fly Tying	vises	Biddeford, Maine, US, founded in 1975	
Merco Products	bobbins and other tools	Montana, US, founded in 1993	
NorVise	vises	Hockessin, Delaware, US, founded in the 1980s	
PEAK Engineering and Automation	vises	Loveland, Colorado, US	
Regal	vises	Orange, Massachusetts, founded in 2004	
Renzetti	vises	Romansville, Pennsylvania, US, founded in the early 1970s	
Stonfo Fishing Tackle	vises and other tools	Italy	
Sunrise Fly Tying Tools	tools	India	
Wolff	vises	Spartanburg, South Carolina, US, founded in 1983	

== Retailers ==
Fly shops sell materials and tools for fly tying, fly fishing tackle, hand made flies, and fly fishing clothing. Retailers of fly tying materials and tools include:

- 54 Dean Street, Italy
- A Blaze in the Northern Fly, Qualicum Beach, BC, Canada
- The Fly Shack, US
- The Fly Stop, San Diego, California
- The Fly Tying Company, London, UK
- Flyshop New Zealand, New Zealand
- J. Stockyards Fly Fishing, US
- Lords of Rivers, France
- Orvis, Sunderland, Vermont, US; founded in 1856
- Parks' Fly Shop
- Reel Flies, UK
- Diamond State Fly Co, Flippin, Arkansas, US
- The Essential Fly, UK
