= Grey Ghost Streamer =

Artificial fly fishing lure

- Artificial fly
- Grey Ghost
- Type: Streamer
- Imitates: Baitfish, Smelt

History
- Creator: Carrie G. Stevens
- Created: 1924

Materials
- Typical sizes: 2-4
- Thread: Black 6/0
- Tail: None
- Body: Orange floss
- Wing: Golden pheasant crest, four gray hackles of equal length
- Ribbing: Flat silver tinsel
- Tag: Flat silver tinsel
- Cheek: Jungle cock
- Shoulder: Silver pheasant body feather

Uses
- Primary use: Trout

Reference(s)
- Pattern references: Carrie G. Stevens-Maker of Rangeley Favorite Trout and Salmon Flies (2000), Hilyard

The Grey Ghost Streamer is an artificial fly, of the streamer type. Its primary function is to imitate smelt. The streamer's wing gives it a swimming action while trolling or using the Dead Drift technique.

The pattern is widespread and is popular along the Northeast of the United States. Many variations of the streamer occur, mostly to cut down on cost and tying time.

== Origin ==
The streamer was first tied in 1924 by commercial fly tyer Carrie G. Stevens of Madison, Maine. She was the wife of Maine fishing guide, Wallace Stevens. She tied many other flies in a style known as the Rangeley style during her free time. Most of her streamers have the jungle cock cheeks in common. The streamer is regarded as one of her best creations. The pattern is mostly used for trout, of which it is successfully fished. When Stevens tested it at the Upper Dam pool she quickly hooked a 6 pound 13 ounce brook trout, which secured her second prize a Field & Stream competition. Afterwards she became even more involved with fly tying.

== Materials ==
Tag- flat silver tinsel
Body- orange floss

Ribbing- flat silver tinsel

Belly Wing- white bucktail, golden pheasant crest, peacock herl

Wing- olive-grey saddle hackle, golden pheasant crest

Shoulder- white and black striped body feather from silver pheasant

Cheeks- jungle cock
