= Dan Bailey (conservationist) =

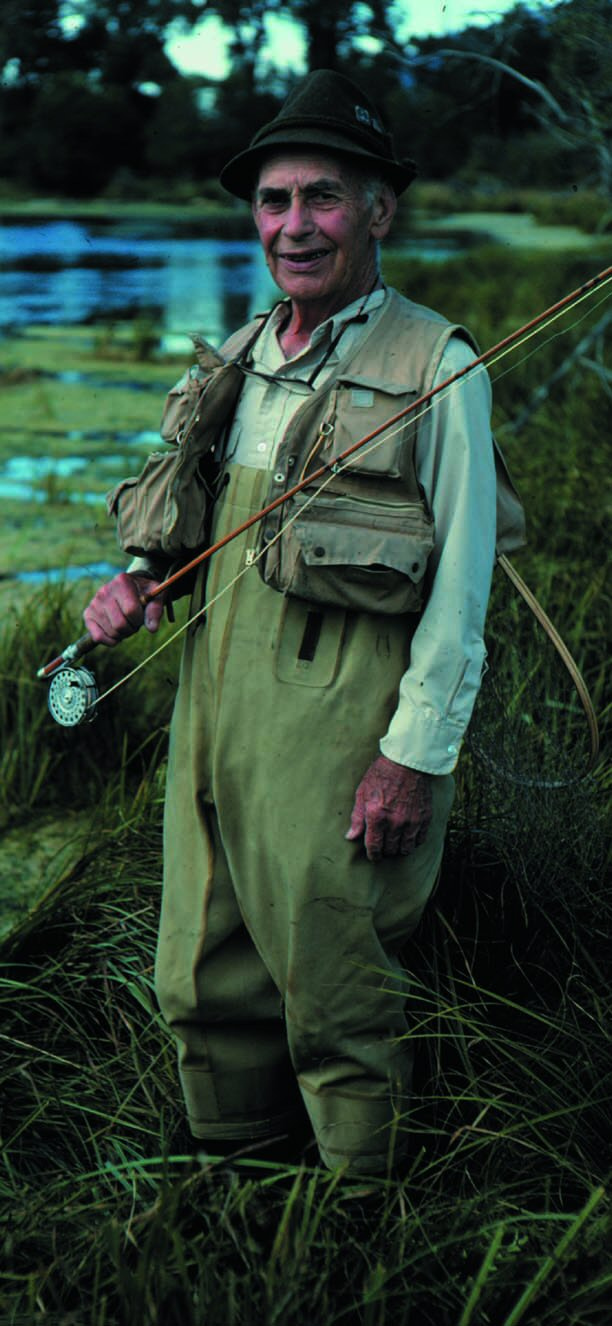
- Dan Bailey, circa 1970s
- Born: March 22, 1904; Russellville, Kentucky, U.S.
- Died: May 24, 1982 (aged 78); Livingston, Montana, U.S.
- Occupation: Fly Shop Owner
- Known for: Fly fishing, Fly tying, Conservationist

Dan Bailey (March 22, 1904 – May 24, 1982) was a fly-shop owner, innovative fly developer and staunch Western conservationist. Born on a farm near Russellville, Kentucky, Bailey is best known for the fly shop he established in Livingston, Montana in 1938. Dan Bailey's Fly Shop is still in business.

== Early life ==
Dan Bailey graduated from The Citadel, The Military College of South Carolina, in 1926 and earned a master's degree in physics from the University of Kentucky. He was a teacher in Missouri when he became interested in fly fishing. His next job brought him to Lehigh University where he was able to pursue trout fishing in the central Pennsylvania chalkstreams. In 1929 while teaching at the Brooklyn Polytechnic Institute he pursued a Ph.D. in Physics from New York University.

While Bailey was in New York, he met and befriended Lee Wulff, another notable fly fisherman. They fished the waters of the Catskills and Adirondacks together and Bailey eventually named a popular series of flies designed by Lee Wulff after him. Bailey learned fly tying while in New York and started teaching classes and selling flies to supplement his income. John McDonald, a noted fly fishing scholar was an early student of Bailey's and became a lifetime friend.

In 1936, Bailey married Helen Hesslein, a nurse and acquaintance of one of his fly tying pupils. They honeymooned on an extended camping and fishing trip in Montana and Wyoming accompanied by his friend and fellow fly fisherman, Preston Jennings, noted author of A Book of Trout Flies. It was during this trip that Dan and Helen began making plans to permanently settle in Montana.

In the summer of 1938, Bailey abandoned his physics education to move West to settle in Montana. The original plan was to settle in Bozeman, Montana but a minor accident with their car going up the east side of Bozeman Pass just west of Livingston forced them back to that town instead. They decided to stay in Livingston and open their fly tying business there instead.

== Dan Bailey's Fly Shop ==
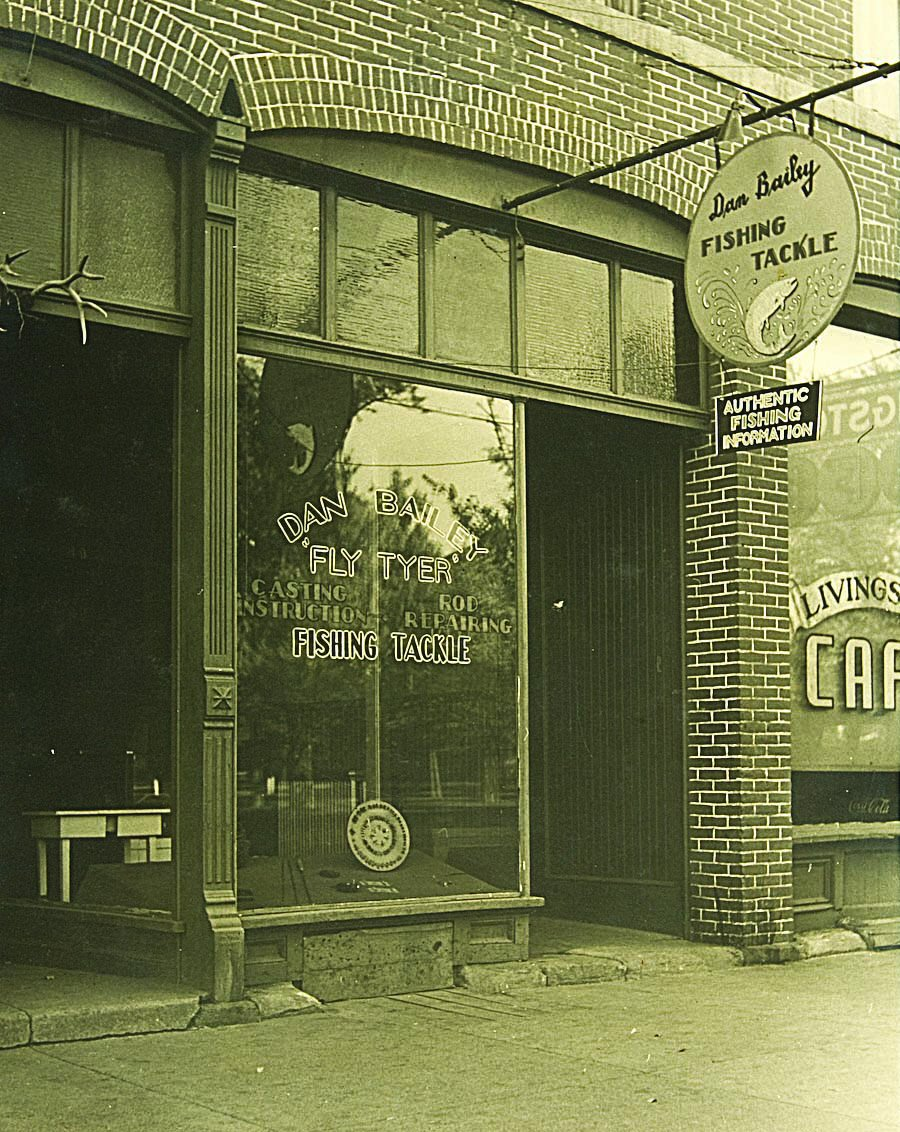
Original Dan Bailey's Fly Shop storefront, 1939

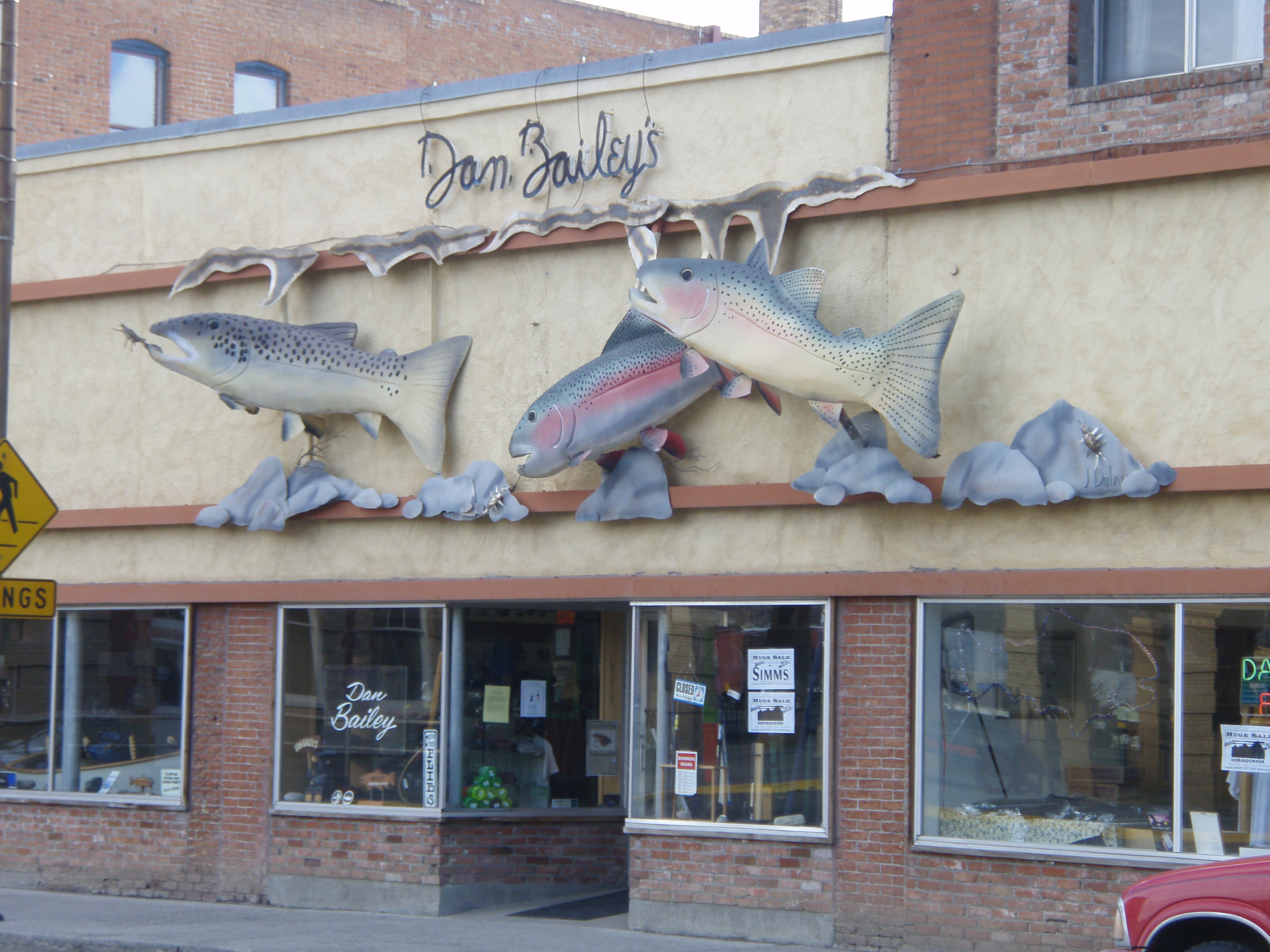
Dan Bailey's Fly Shop, Livingston, MT (2008)

The original fly shop was established in the old Albermarle Hotel at 103 W Park Street along with a small shooting gallery. The Baileys lived in a back room and the rent was $25 a month. Because there was limited opportunity for local fly business, Dan Bailey's became primarily a mail order fly shop and outfitter for visiting anglers. Dan Bailey produced his first mail order catalog in 1941—standard dry flies were $2.50 per dozen. In 1981, the year before Dan's passing, Dan Bailey's Fly Shop was the largest manufacturer of artificial flies in the United States producing over 750,000 flies annually for wholesale and retail customers. The mail order business had over 50,000 subscribers.

=== The Wall Fish ===
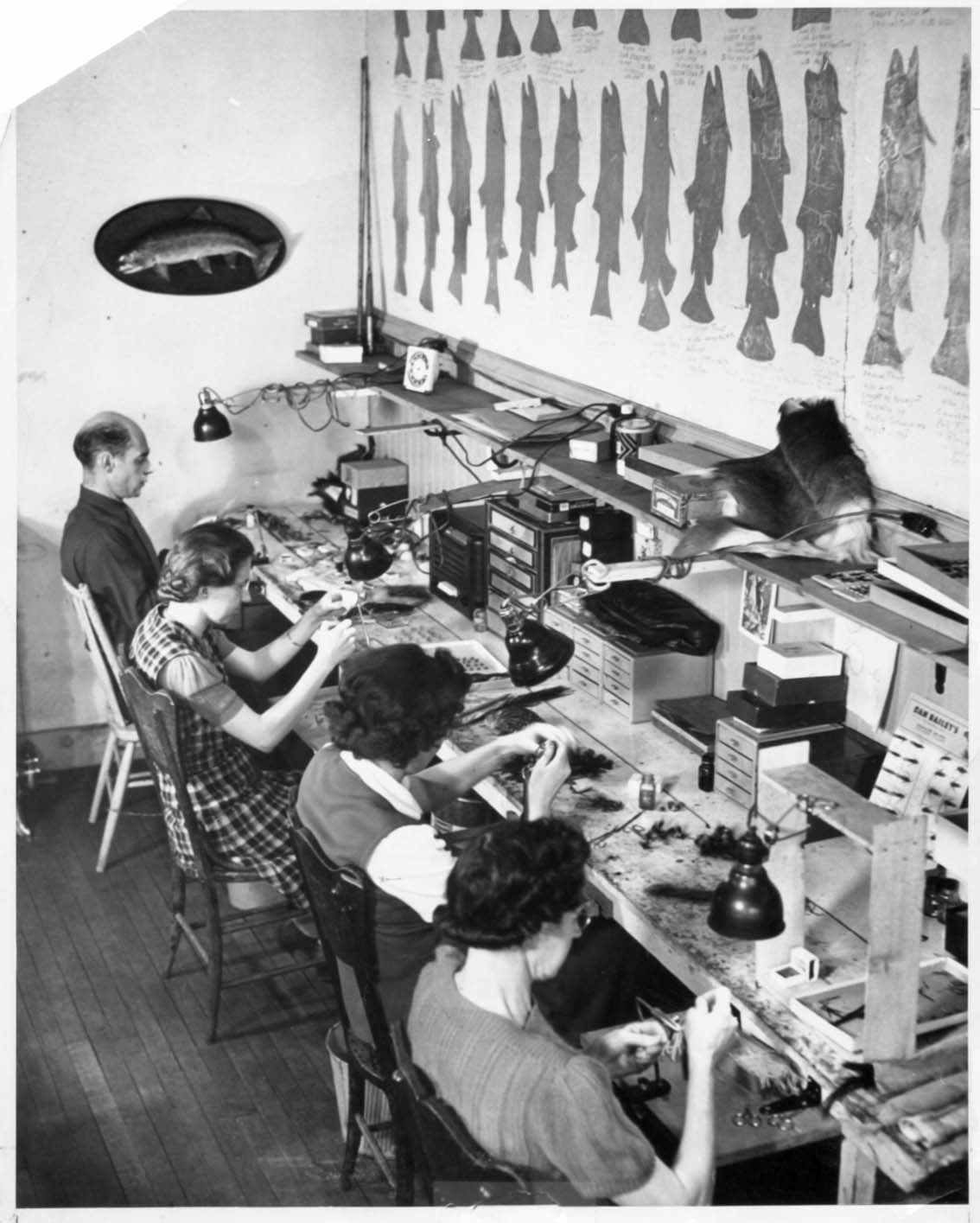
Dan Bailey's Wall of Fame, circa 1940s

A unique aspect of Dan Bailey's Fly Shop was the Wall Fish where anyone who caught a trout of four pounds or more could have the fish outlined on paper with the angler's name, date and place caught. The paper outline would then be hung on the fly shop wall. The first Wall Fish was caught by Gilbert Meloche, a young fly tyer in Dan's shop. The fish was a large Brown trout from Armstrong Spring Creek. By the early 1980s, the wall had over 300 silhouettes of four-pound-plus fish on it. Although the Wall fish practice was stopped when Catch and release fishing came into vogue, the original Wall fish are still present in the shop.

== Innovative Western Fly Tyer ==
Through his fly shop, mail order business and extensive correspondence and fishing experiences with other fly fisherman including Joe Brooks. Bailey became known as one of the most innovative fly tiers in the West. Using his knowledge of Eastern fly patterns, Bailey adapted these patterns to his experiences on Montana streams into a wide range of new and innovative fly patterns. Some fly patterns credited to Bailey are:

- Marabou Muddler—an evolution of the Muddler Minnow introduced in the 1940s and still one of the most popular trout flies on the market today.
- Mossback Nymph—An extremely popular woven stonefly nymph pattern that Bailey introduced in the 1940s.
- Bailey Wulffs-Black, Grizzly, Blond and Brown hair wing dry flies named after Lee Wulff.
- Red Variant—A 1940s quill bodied may fly imitation adapted from eastern quill bodied flies.
- Green Drake—A 1950s may fly imitation originally tied for West Yellowstone anglers fishing Henry's Fork in Idaho.

== Conservation efforts ==
Apart from his fly shop, Bailey earned respect and reputation for his efforts to protect and preserve Montana's trout streams. In the 1960s he helped establish the first Montana chapter of Trout Unlimited with fellow fly shop owner, Bud Lilly of West Yellowstone. Bailey ultimately served more than 10 years on the Trout Unlimited board of directors.

Bailey is best known for his successful two decades of grassroots opposition to the proposed Allen Spur dam project that would have dammed a major portion of the Paradise Valley and Yellowstone River south of Livingston.

In a 1959 issue of the Park Country News, Bailey wrote:

Recreation is one of the largest industries in Park County. Its value is less tangible than that of other industries which are easily measurable in terms of payroll or gross return. Several years ago the Fish and Wildlife Service estimated the value of the upper Yellowstone watershed at twenty-thousand dollars per mile per year for sport fishing. As the length of the Yellowstone as it twists and turns through Park County is about a hundred miles, the annual value of its fishing would be a hundred times twenty-thousand or two million dollars. The two greatest threats to the fishing resource of the Yellowstone at present are: 1) The possibility of large water developments which could mean much more of a detriment than a benefit to recreation. 2) The possibility of losing access to much of our best fishing water as fishing pressure increases...

Bailey was also a prominent member of the Izaak Walton League, Nature Conservancy, Sierra Club, Wilderness Society, and Federation of Fly Fishers.

Bailey died of heart failure on May 24, 1982, at the age of 78.

After Bailey's passing, then Governor of Montana, Ted Schwinden proclaimed August 14, 1982 Dan Bailey Fishing Day to honor his legacy.

WHEREAS, the Montana Fish and Game Commission with sorrow and regret, observes the death of Dan Bailey of Livingston, Montana; and

WHEREAS, Dan's remarkable life includes many significant contributions to the preservation of trout waters, the conservation of trout and the art of angling; and

WHEREAS, the accomplishments of Dan Bailey were of such magnitude that the people of Montana can be assured for generations to come that Montana anglers will have a riffle for their flies, a trout for their efforts and flowing rivers for their souls; and

WHEREAS, the special relationship between Dan Bailey and the Yellowstone River ordains that his spirit will forever dwell in its waters, and that the river will run free as long as anglers share his love and respect for the river.

Now, Therefore I, Ted Schwinden Governor of the State of Montana, do hereby proclaim August 14, 1982 as Dan Bailey Fishing Day in the State of Montana and urge all Montanans on that day to observe the contributions of Dan Bailey that are now recorded and remembered through sparkling riffles, still pools and wild trout.

Ted Schwinden, Governor of Montana Attest: Jim Waltermire, Secretary of State

== See also ==
- List of American fishers
