= American Museum of Fly Fishing =

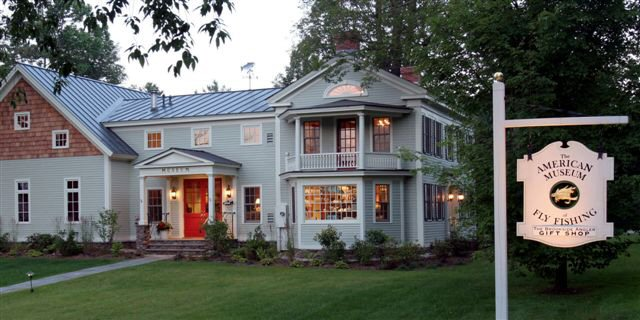
- Established: 1968
- Location: 4104 Main Street; Manchester, Vermont 05254 United States
- Coordinates: 43.1680°N 73.0671°W
- Type: Special Interest Museum
- Website: American Museum of Fly Fishing

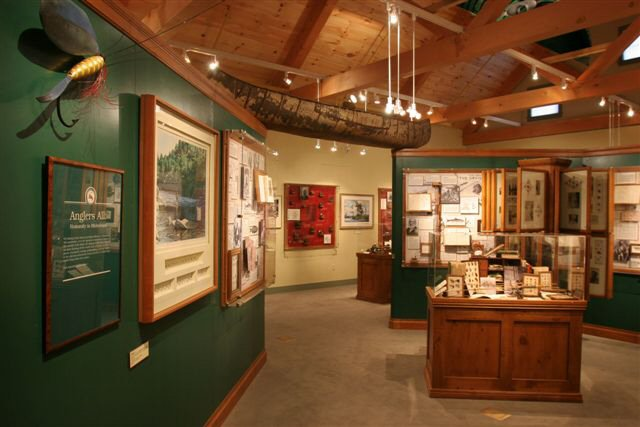
Exhibits at the American Museum of Fly Fishing

The American Museum of Fly Fishing is a museum in Manchester, Vermont, United States, that preserves and exhibits artifacts related to American angling.

== Exhibits and collections ==
The American Museum of Fly Fishing was established in 1968 in Manchester, Vermont, by a group of anglers who believed that the history of angling was an important part of American culture and tradition. The museum was created to serve as an institution to research, preserve, and interpret the treasures of angling history.

Today, the museum serves as a repository for and conservator to the world's largest collection of angling and angling-related items, numbering in the thousands. The collections and exhibits document the evolution of fly fishing as a sport, art form, craft, and industry in the United States and abroad, dating as far back as the sixteenth century. Rods, reels, flies, tackle, art, photographs, manuscripts, and books form the museum's permanent collection, including the oldest documented flies in the world.

The museum has been accredited by the American Alliance of Museums since 1993 and received reaccreditation in 2009. The museum is one of approximately 776 museums across the nation with this designation and one of only five in the state of Vermont.

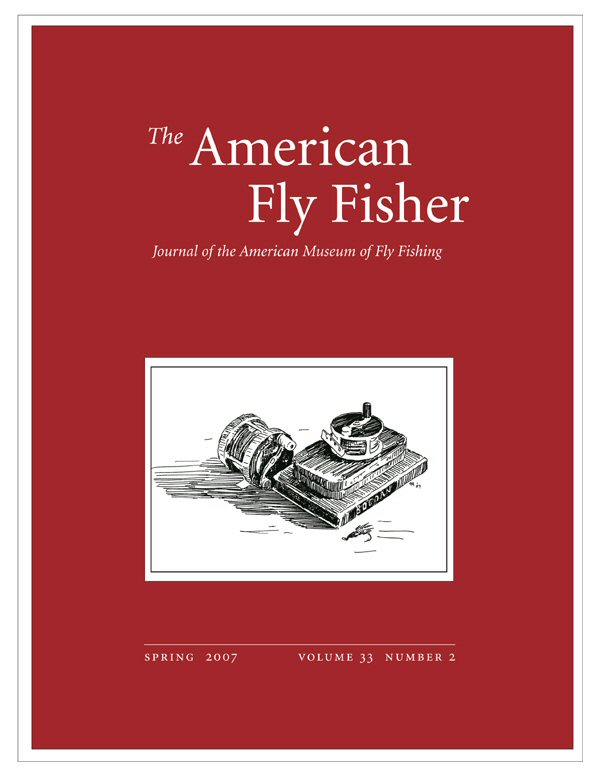
Spring 2007 cover of The American Fly Fisher, journal of the American Museum of Fly Fishing

== Publications ==
Since 1974 the American Museum of Fly Fishing has published the journal The American Fly Fisher.

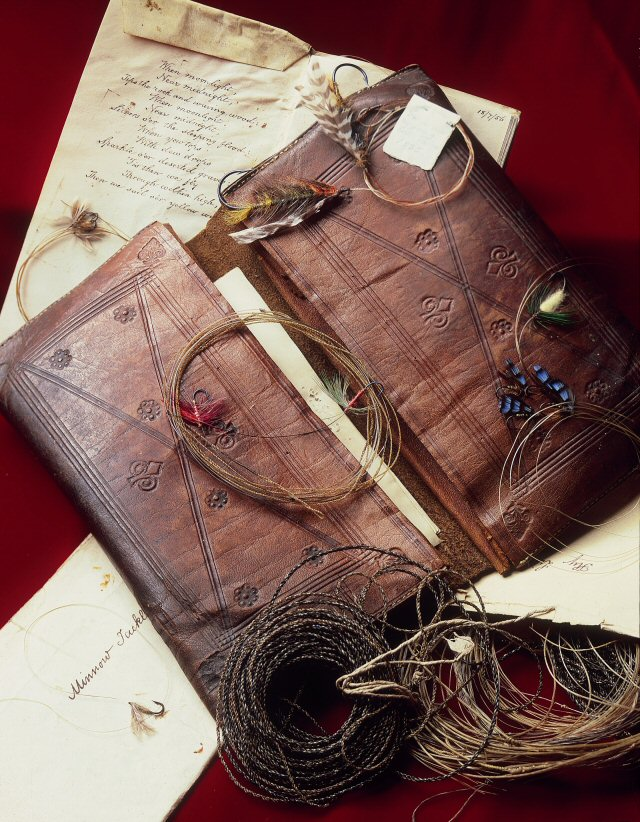
Items from the collections of the American Museum of Fly Fishing

== See also ==
- Bibliography of fly fishing
- Fly fishing
- Fly tying
