= Carrie G. Stevens =

American fly fisher and fly lure tier

Carrie Gertrude Stevens (1882–1970) was an American fly fisher and fly lure tier from Madison and Upper Dam, Maine, and the creator of Rangeley Favorite trout and salmon flies. Self-taught in the art of fly tying, Stevens invented the Grey Ghost Streamer, an imitation of the Smelt, Osmerus mordax. Stevens' flies received national and international acclaim, and she was honored after her death with the naming of August 15, 1970 as "Carrie Gertrude Stevens Day" by the Governor of Maine.

== Life ==
Carrie Gertrude Wills was born to Albert and Nellie Wills on February 22, 1882, in Vienna, Maine. She was the youngest of six. Leaving Vienna, Carrie met Wallace Clinton Stevens in Mexico, Maine, and the two married on May 1, 1905, in West Farmington. By 1919 they had moved to Upper Dam, where Wallace established himself as a fishing guide. Carrie worked as a milliner. There, through contact with her husband's clientele, Stevens was introduced to flies tied in the English style and began to experiment herself.

On July 1, 1924, Stevens landed a 6-pound 13 ounce brook trout, Salvelinus fontinalis, that won her recognition in the Field & Stream magazine. Her patterns were recognized and promoted by fly tying contests throughout New England, and two issues of Field & Stream focusing on her fly tie patterns and skill as a fisherman promoted her patterns nationally. Stevens began to receive orders for her flies from throughout the United States, "and soon I was in the fly business." Stevens' patterns were later, sometimes incorrectly, attributed to Charles Edward "Shang" Wheeler (1872–1949), a Connecticut state representative and senator, or to Connecticut Judge Charles H. Welles; both men recognized and promoted her patterns, and tied flies themselves. Stevens attributed her initial interest in flies to Wheeler and named some after him, writing to friend Joseph D. Bates, "It is doubtful if I would ever have made a fly if Mr. Wheeler had not sent us one to try out in the pool in 1920."

Responding to claims that he and not Stevens had been responsible for the famous fly patterns, Wheeler later described how Stevens had skillfully developed his ties with materials such as "rooster's hackle, deer hair, tinsel, or blue heron's feathers," remarkably improving their performance.

Stevens became not only an astute fly tier, but also entrepreneur and saleswoman. According to Pamela Bates, "Carrie had the ability to know exactly what the sports would bite for – regardless of the preferences of the fish." Her fly tying business peaked after the Second World War, but due to poor health, Stevens became less active and officially retired in 1963.

Stevens died on August 3, 1970. After her death, Maine Governor Kenneth M. Curtis declared August 15, 1970 to be "Carrie Gertrude Stevens Day." Stevens remains the only fly tier to have been recognized by the state in Maine.

== Fly ties ==
Stevens innovated fly tying design by shortening streamers to extend only slightly beyond hooks, and by using longer hook shanks. She furthermore brought fly profiles closer to those of baitfish by tying materials parallel to the hook, and used fly shoulders to imitate bait fish gill plates. While patterns similar to the Grey Ghost existed prior to Stevens' work, she pioneered the streamer by using new colors, structure, and less exotic materials, making it more effective and accessible. Her hooks were principally supplied by S. Allcock & Company Ltd. of Redditch, England, and her feathers supplied by George Fletcher of Rangeley, Maine.

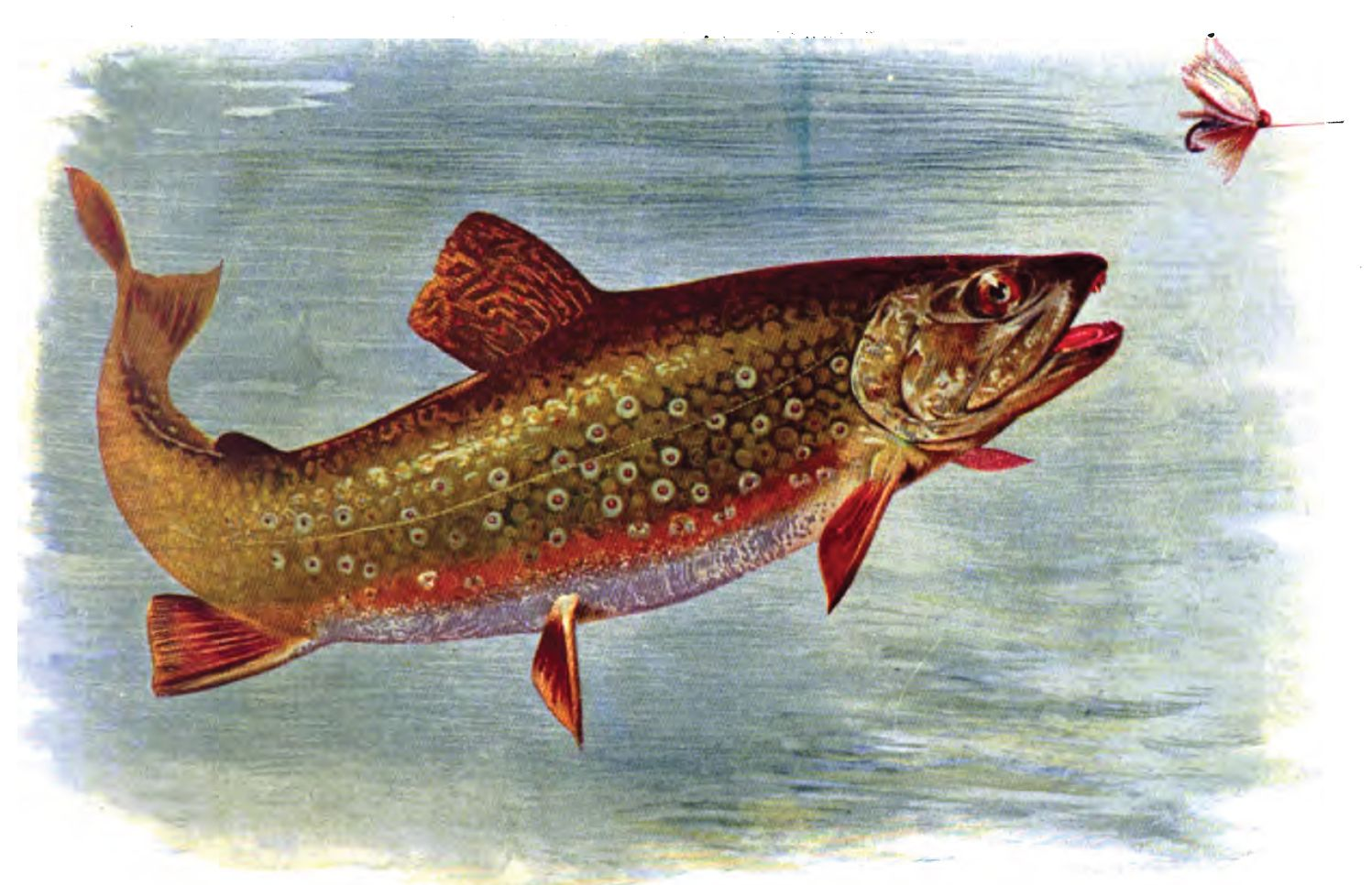
Brook trout chasing an artificial fly.

Stevens' fly early fly ties were numbered rather than named, a practice common in the 19th century. But as her popularity grew, Stevens began to name her patterns as well. Early patterns from the late 1920s and early 1930s included the Rangeley Favorite, the Stevens Favorite, the Pirate, the Green Beauty, and the Wizard. Patterns from the later 1930s include the Shang's special, the Golden Witch, the Blue Devil, the Gray Ghost, the Witch, the Greyhound, the Happy Garrison, the White Devil, and the Don's Delight. During the 1930s, 49% of all record fish taken from the Upper Dam were caught with Stevens' flies. During the 1940s and 1950s, most American fly tiers making streamers attempted to imitate proportions invented by Stevens.

Other flies created by Stevens include the Colonel Bates, named after her friend Robert D. Bates Jr., the Will Ketch, and the General MacArthur. Stevens' popular Colonel Bates fly was originally named the Captain Bates, its name changing as Bates was promoted in rank during his career in the United States Army.

Following the success of her husband while using her flies for trolling, a rare or unheard-of practice at the time, Stevens' flies became used for trolling throughout North America. Her flies were purchased by fishermen in Alaska, Oregon, Newfoundland and New Brunswick, New Zealand and Patagonia.

== Legacy ==
In his series on American streamer Patterns, Colonel Robert Bates included 14 patterns tied by Carrie Stevens; other sources suggest she may have invented as many as one hundred. The Gray Ghost remains one of the most popular fly ties used in trout and salmon fishing, and has been modified into many forms.

Carrie Stevens is the subject of a book written by Graydon R. Hilyard and his son, Leslie Hilyard, "Carrie G. Stevens, Maker of the Rangeley Favorite Trout and Salmon Flies".

== See also ==
- Mooselookmeguntic Lake
- Grey Ghost Streamer

== Sources ==
- Bashline, Jim (1992). "It pays to think big: industrial length streamers". Field & Stream. 96 (10). Times Mirror Magazine, Inc.: 56.
- Gill, Theodore; Goode, G. Brown (1903). American Fishes: A Popular Treatise upon the Game and Food Fishes of North America. Boston: L. C. Page and Company.
- Hellekson, Terry (2005). Fly ties: encyclopedia of the fly tier's art. Layton, UT: Gibbs Smith. ISBN 9781586856922.
- Hilyard, Graydon; Hilyard, Leslie (2000). Carrie G. Stevens, Maker of the Rangeley Favorite Trout and Salmon Flies. Mechanicsburg, PA: Stackpole Books. ISBN 9780811703536.
- Walberg, Anders (2003). Complete Book of Trout Flyfishing. Chartwell Books. ISBN 9780785815235.
- Valla, Mike (2013). "Carrie Stevens (1882-1970)". The Founding Flies-43 American Masters Their Patterns and Influences. Mechanicsburg, PA: Stackpole Books. pp. 126–134. ISBN 9780811708333.
