= James Deren =

James "Jim" Deren was an American fisher. He owned and operated the Angler's Roost, a well-known fishing-tackle shop in New York City, for over forty years. The many notable clients of the Roost included Ted Williams, Benny Goodman, Bing Crosby, and Dwight D. Eisenhower. Deren invented several flies, such as The Fifty Degrees and Deren's Fox Dry Fly, and he was well known to anglers as a good source of information. He was a guest on "The Sportsman's Guide", a television show that ran for 26 weeks on the DuMont Television Network, and a technical panelist on the radio show "The Rod and Gun Club of the Air".

Deren began tying flies in grade school in New Jersey and sold his flies in New York, New Jersey and Pennsylvania. He started out as a fishing-tackle buyer for a shop in Newark and then worked for Alex Taylor and Company in New York City. He then became a buyer and salesman for Kirkland Brothers, where he advised clients on the technical aspects of fly-fishing and handled their fly-tying material. At that time he also began selling flytying material through a mail-order business he ran at night. This side business led him to quit his job at Kirkland Brothers and open the first Angler's Roost at 207 East Forty-third St., between 2nd and 3rd Ave, which later moved to the basement of the Chrysler Building and then the East Forty-fourth St location on the third floor of 141 East Forty-fourth St. near Grand Central Station.

Deren was a first-rate angler and well known raconteur in the world of flyfishing. One of his notable quotes was posted in his shop: "There don't have to be a thousand fish in a river; let me locate a good one and I'll get a thousand dreams out of him before I catch him—and, if I catch him, I'll turn him loose."

Deren worked at the Roost until shortly before his death in 1983. In 1985, a tag sale and auction of his remaining merchandise was held for two days at Bedford Historical Hall in Bedford Village, New York.
