= Catskill Fly Fishing Center and Museum =

Museum and organization in New York, US

Coordinates: 41.92699°N 74.84215°W

- Formation: 1983; 43 years ago
- Type: Nonprofit
- Tax ID no.: 11-2608536
- Legal status: 501(c)(3)
- Headquarters: Livingston Manor, New York
- Board President: Anthony J. Magardino
- Director of Operations: Laura Colangelo
- Website: https://cffcm.com/

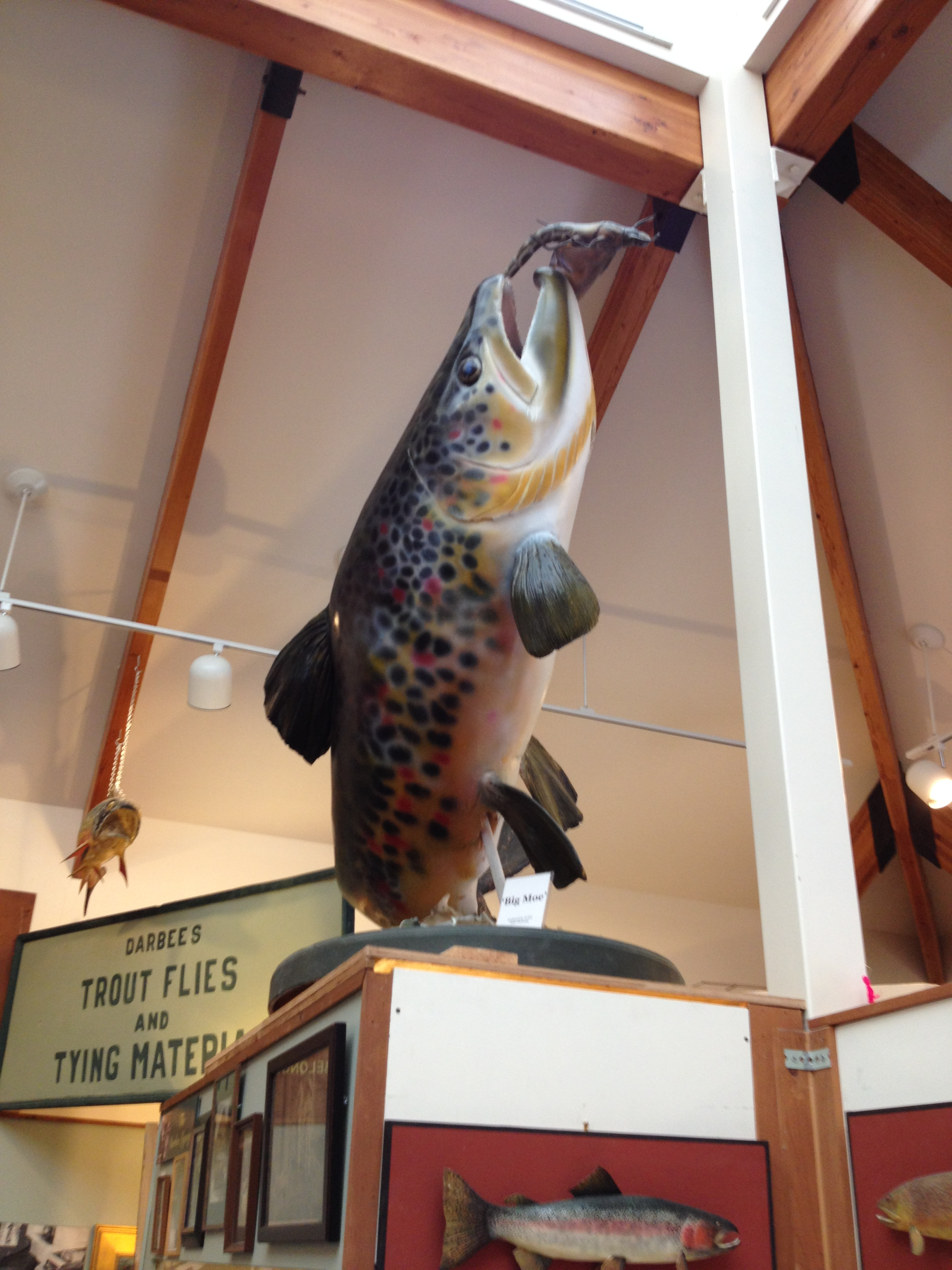
The museum features this sculpture of a brown trout.

The Catskill Fly Fishing Center and Museum is a nonprofit educational organization dedicated to preserving America's fly fishing heritage; teaching its future generations of fly fishers; and protecting its fly fishing environment. The museum is located along Willowemoc Creek in the heart of the Catskills at 1031 Old Route 17 in Livingston Manor, New York.

The center operates a museum, an education center, as well as an environmental research center. It collects, cares for, interprets, and displays angling equipment, art, and artifacts in a way that explains the traditions and techniques of the fly fishing sport. The center conducts educational programs in river ecology, angling history, stream craft, including fishing etiquette, fly tying, fly casting, aquatic entomology, and stream improvement to increase public awareness of the values of fly fishing, prime among which is respect for the natural environment and the habitats of fly-responsive fishes.

The museum opened in 1983 as a storefront museum in Roscoe, New York. By 1986 and thereafter, the museum enhanced its resources and facilities, enabling it to consolidate activities, establish environmental camps for children, and plan for the future.

On May 28, 1995, it opened at its current location on a 35-acre (140,000 m^{2}) parcel in Livingston Manor, on the banks of Willowemoc Creek. The same year, it received title to the storied Junction Pool, where Willowemoc Creek flows into the Beaver Kill.

The museum is also the home of The Fly Fishing Hall of Fame, The Demarest Rodmakers Gallery, The Poul Jorgensen Golden Hook Award, The Catskill Rodmakers Gathering, and The Hardy Cup. Projects currently underway include the Wulff Gallery and The Catskill Rodmakers Workshop and Arts of the Angler Craft Center. It is a sister museum to Italy's International Museum of Fly Fishing, Stanislao Kuckiewicz in Castel di Sangro.
