= Trout Unlimited =

U.S. non-profit organization

- Trout Unlimited, Inc.
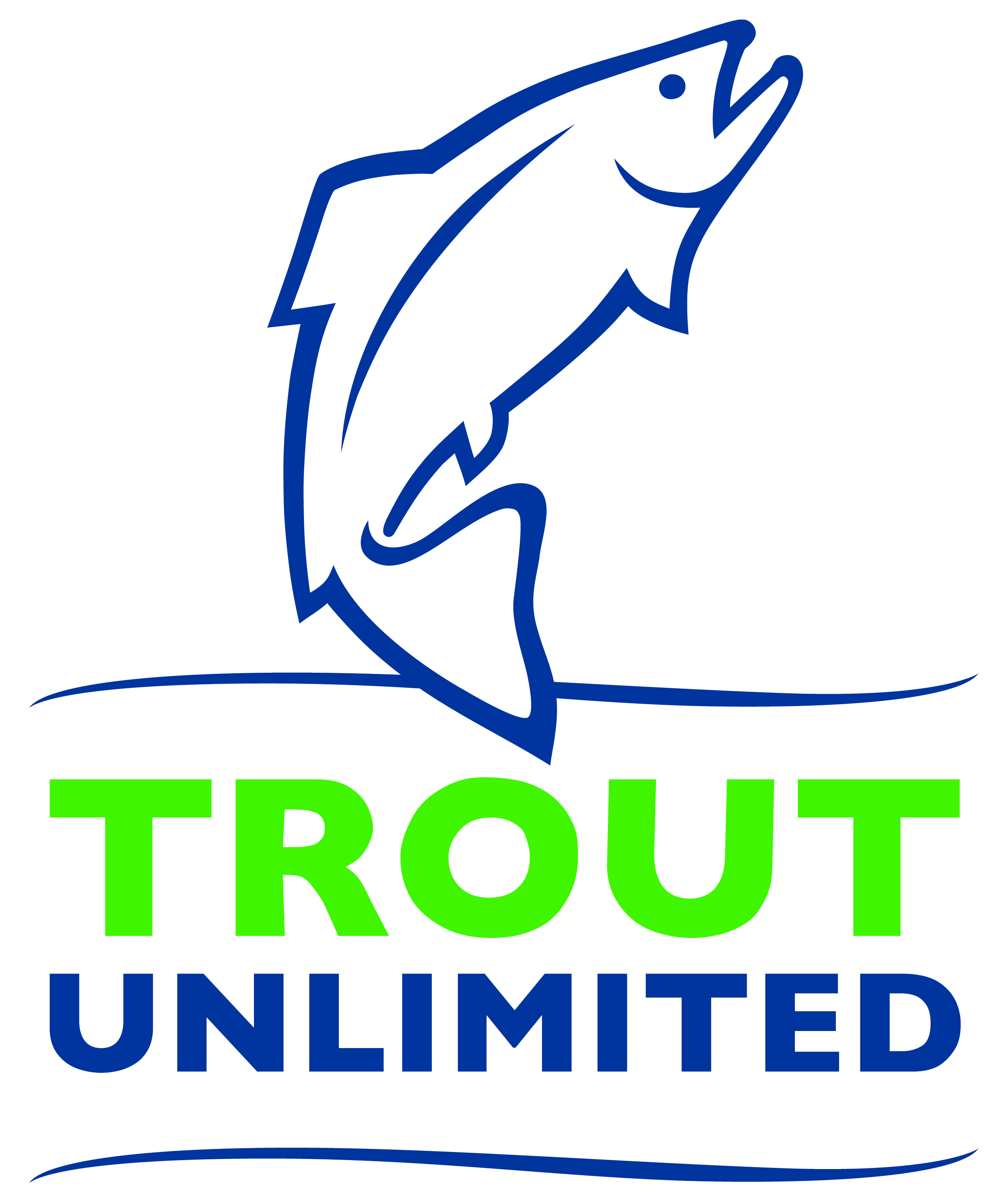
- Abbreviation: TU
- Formation: 1959
- Founded at: Michigan, United States
- Type: Nonprofit
- Legal status: Charitable organization
- Purpose: Conservation, protection and restoration of American cold-water fisheries and their watersheds
- Headquarters: 1777 North Kent Street
- Location: Arlington, Virginia, US
- Coordinates: 38.89746790324031°N 77.06931103714035°W
- Region served: United States
- Members: 150,000 (2018)
- Official language: English
- Subsidiaries: 387 local chapters in 42 councils
- Budget: $50 million (2018)
- Website: www.tu.org

Trout Unlimited (TU) is an American non-profit organization dedicated to the conservation of freshwater streams, rivers, and associated upland habitats for trout, salmon, other aquatic species, and people. It is headquartered in Arlington, Virginia. The organization began in 1959 in Michigan. It has since spread throughout the United States and has local chapters in nearly every state.

== History and profile ==
Trout Unlimited was founded in 1959 along the banks of Michigan's Au Sable River by a group of 16 anglers who were interested in protecting trout in that and other popular fishing rivers. Founders included Art Neumann and George Griffith, who is also known for creating the Griffith's Gnat fly pattern. The first president was Dr. Casey E. Westell Jr, and Art Neumann was the first vice president.

TU is a national organization with more than 150,000 members organized into approximately 400 local chapters. In 2023, Trout Unlimited received a rating score of 93% from Charity Navigator.

The organization has developed various tools to help prioritize protection, restoration, and conservation efforts. These tools include the Conservation Success Index (CSI), a framework for assessing the health of cold-water fish species throughout their native range, and the Brook Trout Portfolio Analysis, which utilizes GIS technology to assess brook trout habitat strongholds.

== Activities ==
Trout Unlimited undertakes projects, programs and awareness campaigns at both the volunteer/chapter level, and staff level. TU members reported more than 734,000 volunteer hours in 2017. Local chapter activities include stream restoration work, citizen science, advocacy, educational programs, group fishing outings, and outreach activities for youth, women and veterans. The organization publishes a quarterly magazine titled TROUT, which is distributed to members.

Stream restoration focuses on improving habitat for trout and other cold water species, including aquatic insects. Restoration methods include planting trees and shrubs along streams to reduce erosion while also increasing shade, strategic addition of boulders or trees to provide cover and improve water depth and flow, and removing or improving barriers that block fish passage, such as culverts and dams. To carry out restoration work, Trout Unlimited partners with the United States Forest Service and United States Fish and Wildlife Service.

Trout Unlimited advocates on issues of interest at both volunteer and staff level. In recent years, for example, Trout Unlimited has publicly opposed a large-scale proposed mine (Pebble Mine) in Alaska's Bristol Bay. Trout Unlimited has also been active in opposing legislative efforts to transfer public lands from federal ownership. In 2012 Trout Unlimited successfully intervened in a federal court lawsuit seeking to protect the native trout waters of western North Carolina., Trout Unlimited established a program in the early 2000s to train volunteers to monitor streams in areas of natural gas extraction in the East's Marcellus Shale region. The program has expanded to include monitoring in areas where pipelines are proposed or being constructed.

Trout in the Classroom is one of TU's largest youth education initiatives. Volunteers help teachers set up aquariums in the classrooms, and students raise trout from eggs during the school year. The program supports ecology-related curriculum and helps to educate students in the importance of cold, clean water not only for trout, but also for people. These programs take place in classrooms all over the country. TU started a similar program for college students with the purpose of raising awareness for "public lands and native fish".

== Funding ==
Trout Unlimited draws some of its funding from membership fees and contributions. Chapters often undertake fundraising activities to pay for their restoration work, or they may seek grants through TU's Embrace a Stream program.

Projects undertaken by scientists and conservationists working for Trout Unlimited are funded through competitive grants as well as cost-share agreements with federal agencies such as the U.S. Forest Service, the U.S. Department of Agriculture, the National Park Service and the Bureau of Land Management. These grants fund large projects such as dam removal and culvert removals or repairs, bank stabilization and restoration, in-stream habitat building.
