= Parks' Salmonfly =

Fly fishing pattern

- Artificial fly
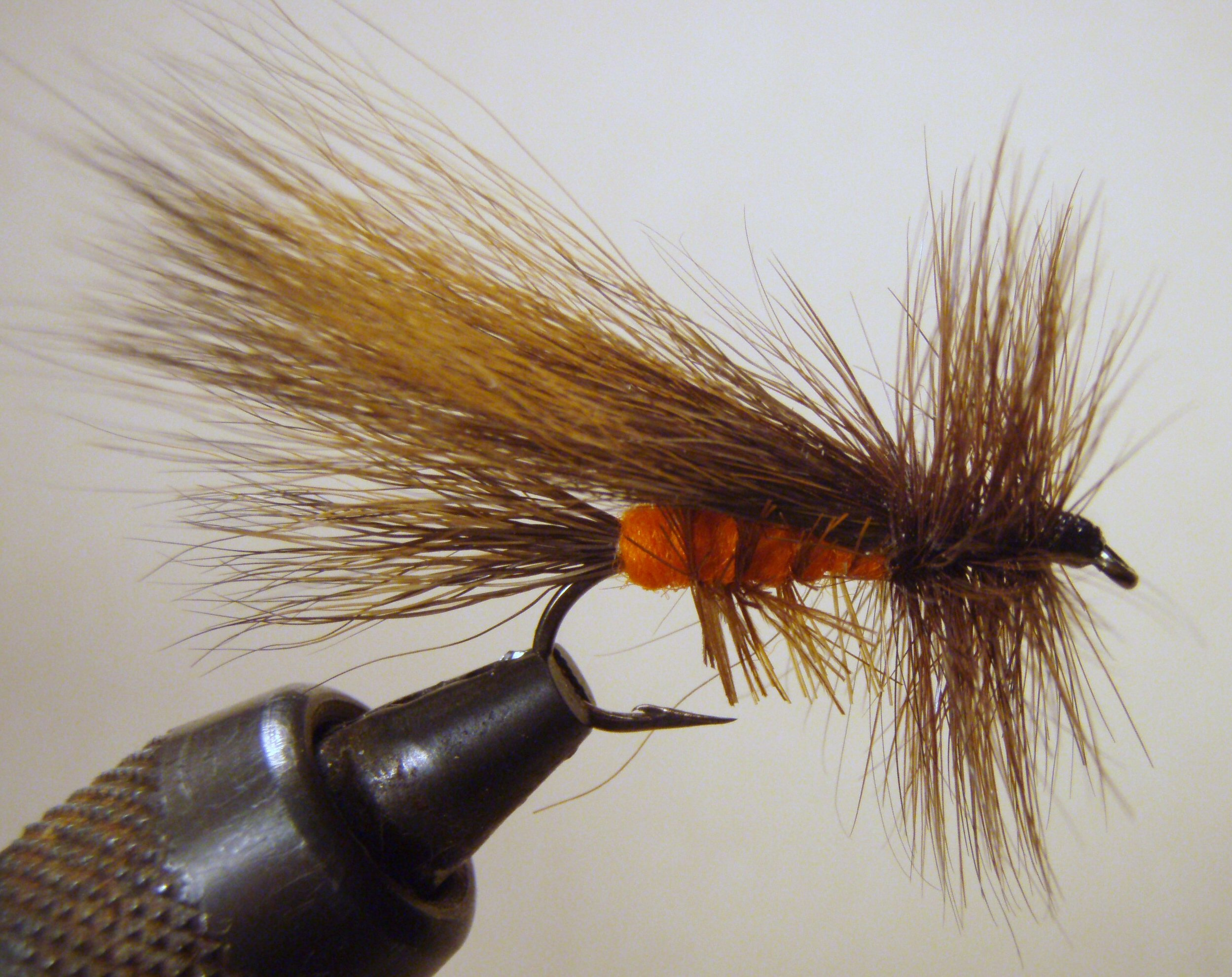
- Parks' Salmonfly
- Type: Dry fly
- Imitates: Giant stoneflies, salmonflies

History
- Creator: Merton Parks
- Created: 1954

Materials
- Typical sizes: 2–8, 6 most common 2X long
- Typical hooks: TMC 200R, Mustad 9671, DaiRiki 700
- Thread: Black 3/0 nylon or kevlar
- Tail: Brown bucktail
- Body: Tangerine or orange acrylic yarn
- Wing: Brown bucktail
- Ribbing: Brown or furnace hackle, clipped
- Hackle: Brown or furnace hackle
- Head: Black thread

Uses
- Primary use: Trout

Reference(s)
- Pattern references: Yellowstone Country Flies, (2013) Wiese

Parks' Salmonfly is a traditional dry fly imitating adults of the family of giant stoneflies or salmonflies (Pteronarcyidae). The most commonly imitated species is Pteronarcys californica or salmonfly common throughout Western North America from British Columbia to California.

== Origin ==
One of the most enduring contributions of Parks' Fly Shop in Gardiner, Montana is the Parks' Salmon Fly, an improved version of the old Sofa Pillow used to imitate the giant stoneflies or Salmon Flies on the Yellowstone River and its tributaries. In 1954, Merton Parks found the older imitations of the giant stonefly unsuitable and created the Parks Salmon Fly. The fly remains popular and in use still today. Charles Brooks, a master Yellowstone fly fisherman, called the Parks' Salmon Fly one of his top three stonefly imitations.

== Imitates ==
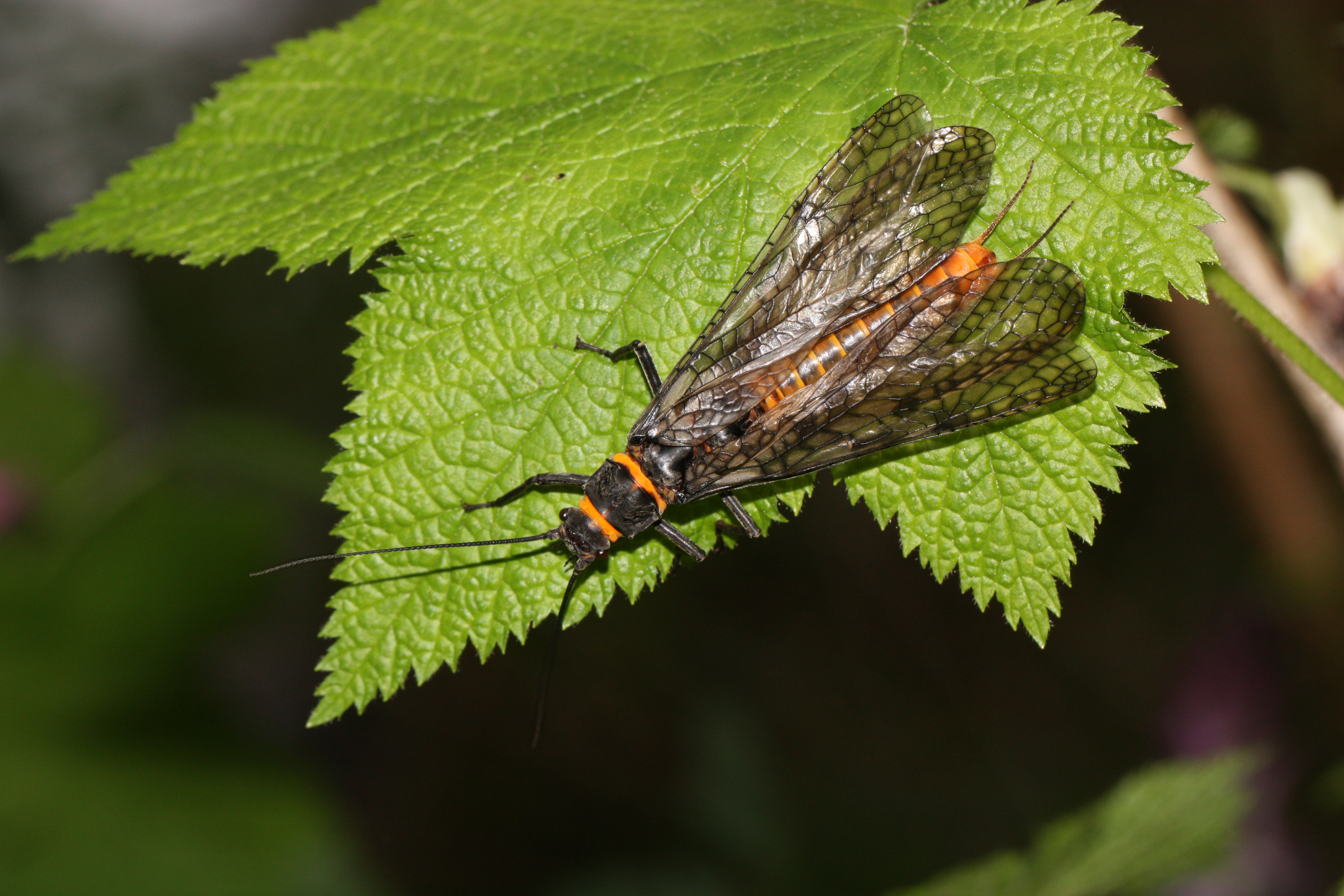
Pteronarcys californica

The Parks' Salmonfly imitates an adult salmonfly (Pteronarcys californica), a species of giant stonefly common in higher-velocity streams and rivers, on medium to large-sized unconsolidated substrates. Salmonflies are found across western North America from California to British Columbia and throughout the Rocky Mountains. On the Yellowstone River and southwest Montana where the Parks' Salmonfly originated, adult salmonflies typically emerge in late June through July. Trout aggressively feed on adults that fall in the water.

== Materials ==
Adult salmonflies are large insects up to 2 inches (5.1 cm) long, so imitations are tied on large, long hooks. Size 6 is the most common but they can be tied on size 2-8 2X long hooks. Merton Parks improved on the original Sofa Pillow by replacing the red floss body with the more bulky and buoyant acrylic yarn in tangerine–a color closer to the living insect. The quill tail and fox squirrel tail wing were replaced with bulkier brown bucktail. The tail, body, wing and hackle are all tied very bulky to create a large profile on the water.

== Variations ==
Elk mane can be substituted for the bucktail. Smaller versions of the fly (size 6–10) tied with lighter bucktail, ginger hackle and yellow yarn are used to imitate Golden stoneflies (Hesperoperla and Calineuria).

== See also ==
- Salmon fly patterns
