= Salmon fly patterns =

Artificial fly patterns imitating the Salmon fly

Salmon fly patterns (not to be confused with flies for Atlantic Salmon) are an important collection of artificial flies used by fly anglers to imitate nymphal and adult forms of Pteronarcys californica a giant stonefly or salmon fly. Salmon flies are common in high gradient, freestone rivers and streams from Western Canada throughout the Western U.S. to Mexico in the Rocky Mountains and coastal mountain ranges. Nymphs live for three to five years before adult emergence which typically occurs in late Spring or early summer. The long lifespan of the nymphal form provides year-round angling opportunities for fly anglers.

== Adult imitative patterns ==
As described in Flies for Trout (1993), Dick Stewart & Farrow Allen
- Bird's Stonefly
- Fluttering Orange Stone
- Foam Stone
- Jug Head
- MacSalmon
- Rainy's Stonefly
- Sofa Pillow Improved

As described in Trout Country Flies (2002), Bruce Staples

- Bar-X Stone
- Bing's Fluttering Stone
- Boehme Salmonfly
- Buck's Stonefly
- Bunyan Bug
- Doc's Stonefly
- Fluttering Stonefly
- Henry's Fork Salmonfly
- Jacklin Giant Salmonfly
- LC Moose
- Marcella's Trout Fly
- Montana Stone (Charlie Brooks)
- Nature Stone Dry
- Parks' Salmonfly
- Picket Pin
- Sofa Pillow
- Stonefly Adult
- Super Sofa Pillow
- Troth Salmon Fly

As described in Yellowstone Country Flies (2013), Walter J. Wiese

- Prom Queen Salmonfly
Adult Salmon fly Imitative Patterns
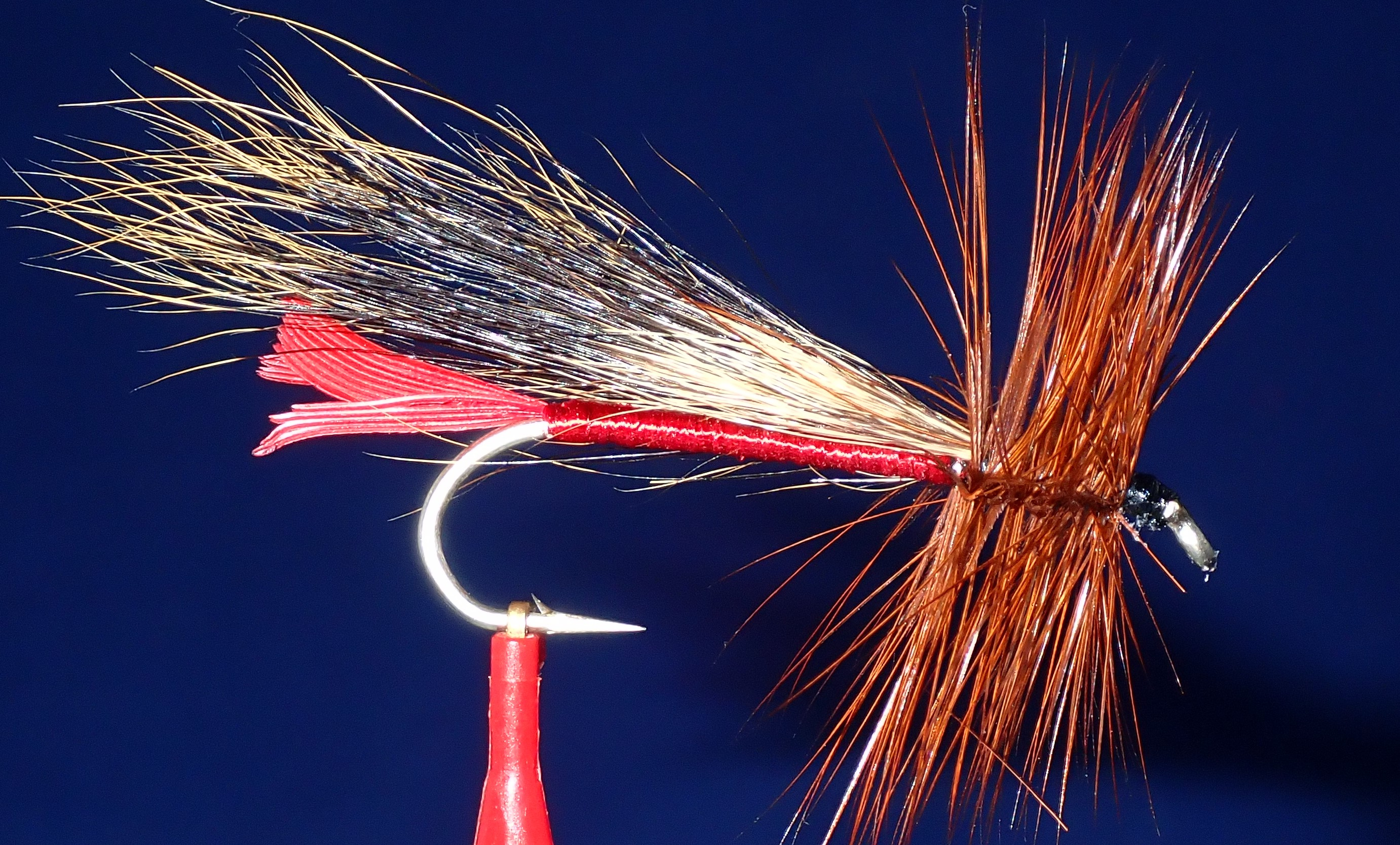
Sofa Pillow

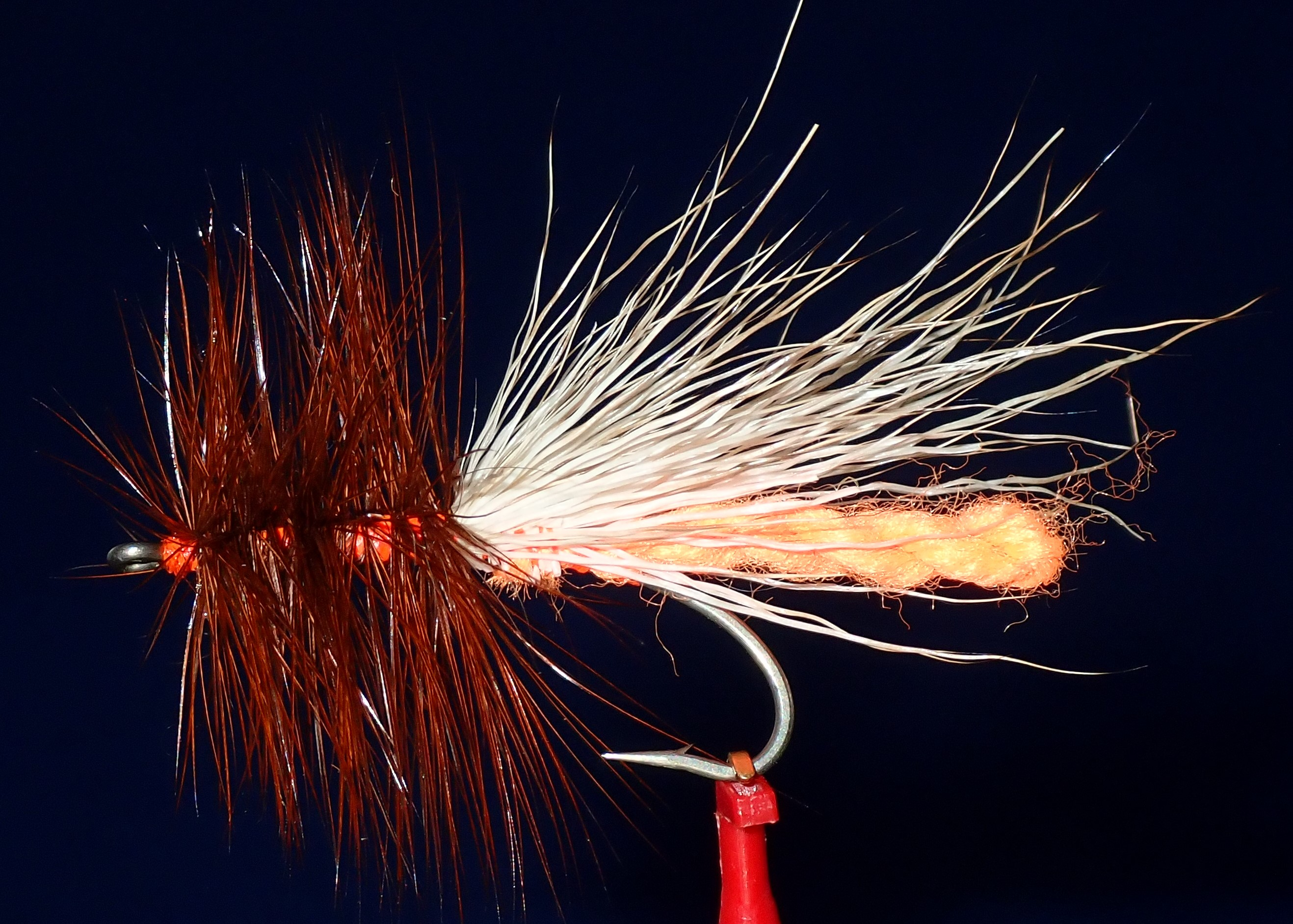
Fluttering Stone

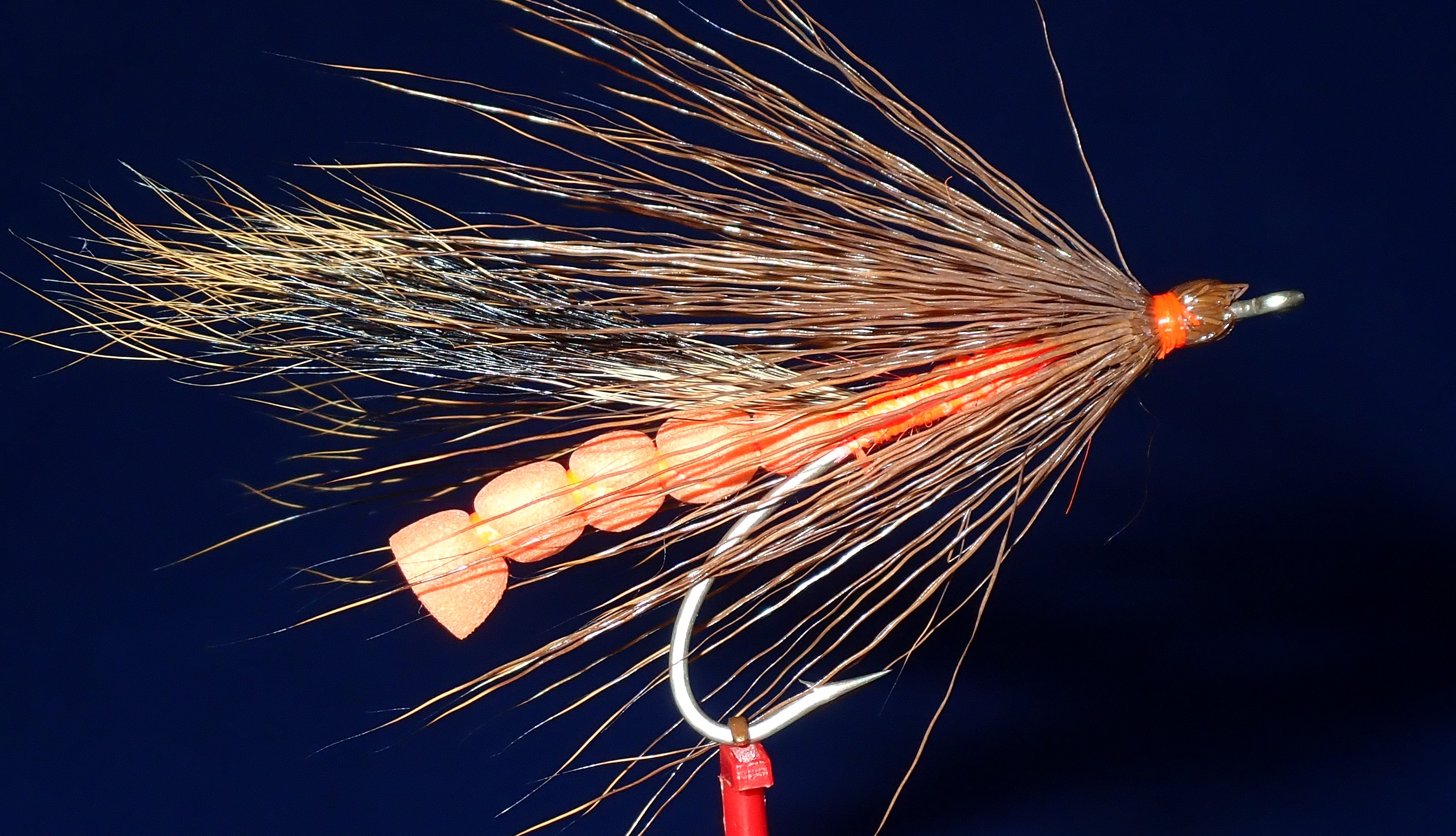
Foam Stone

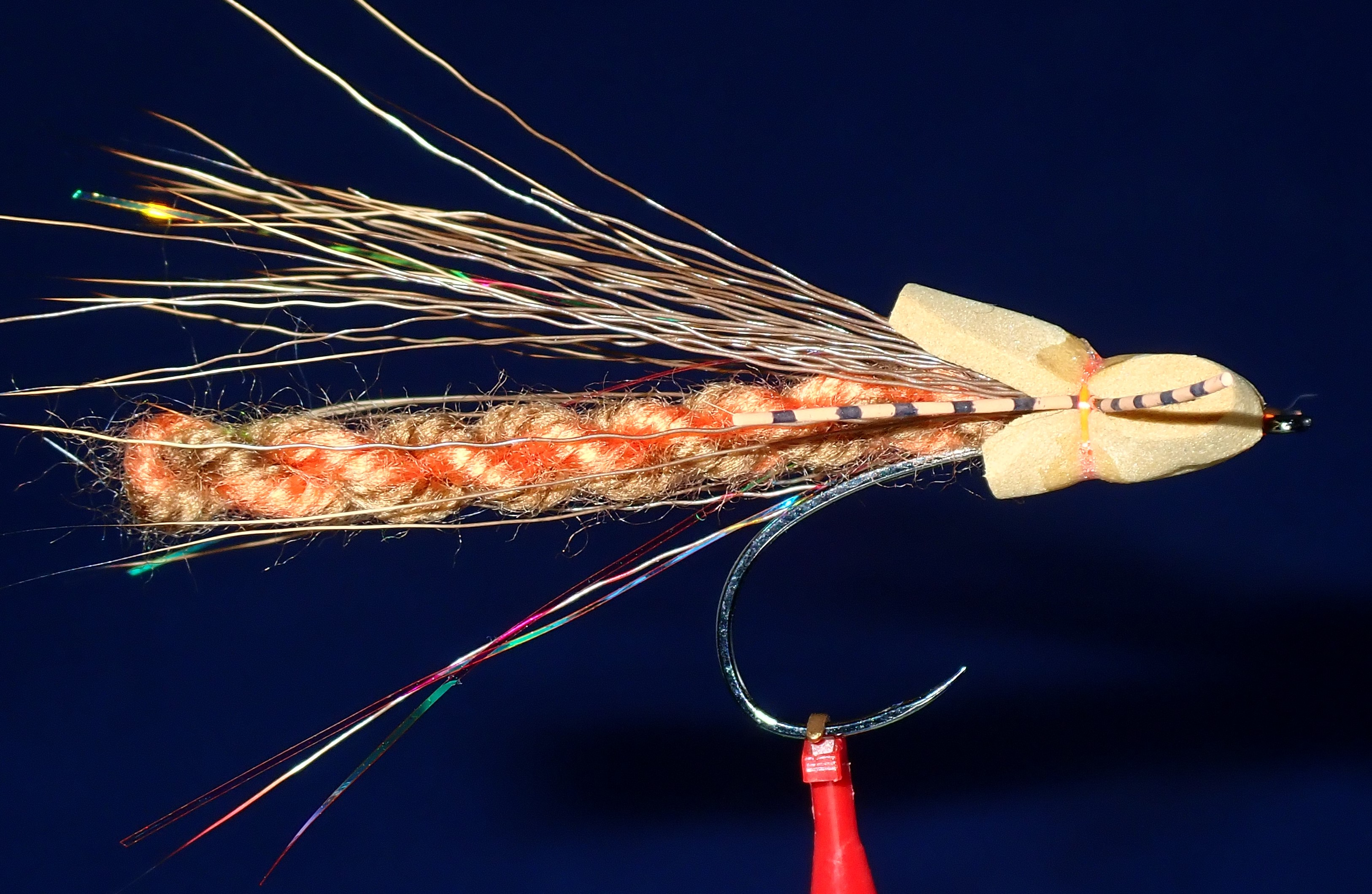
Prom Queen

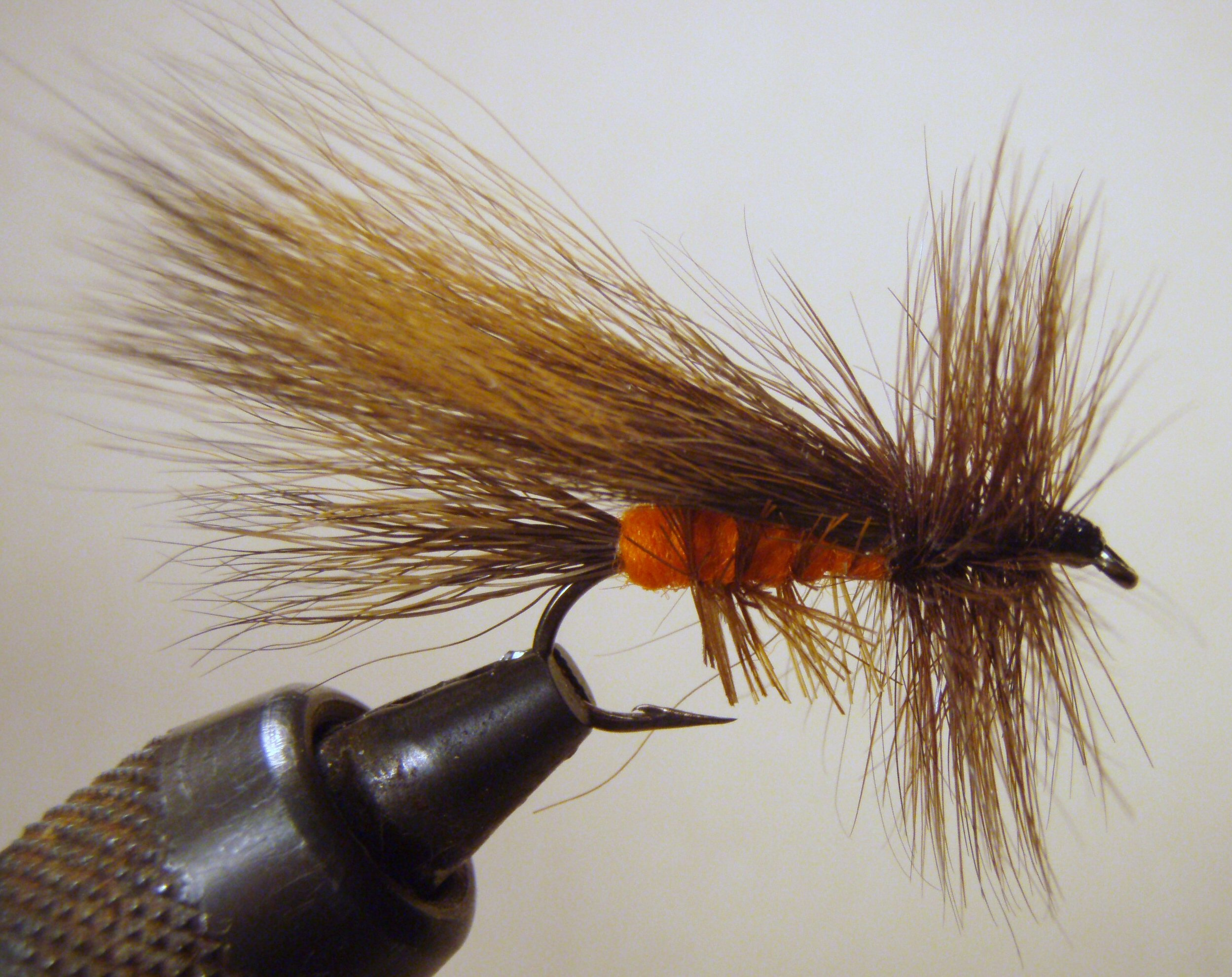
Parks’ Salmon Fly

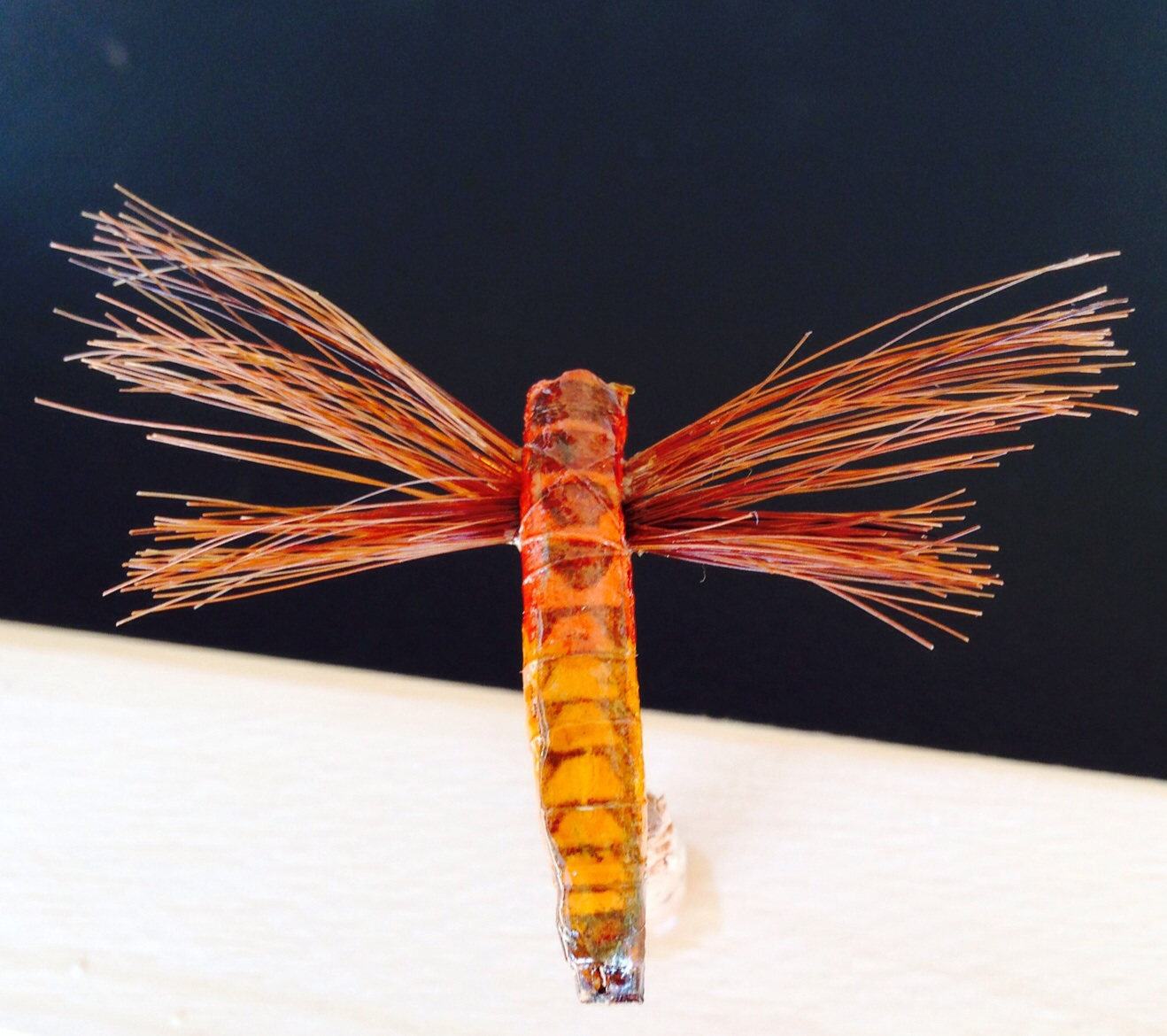
Bunyan Bug

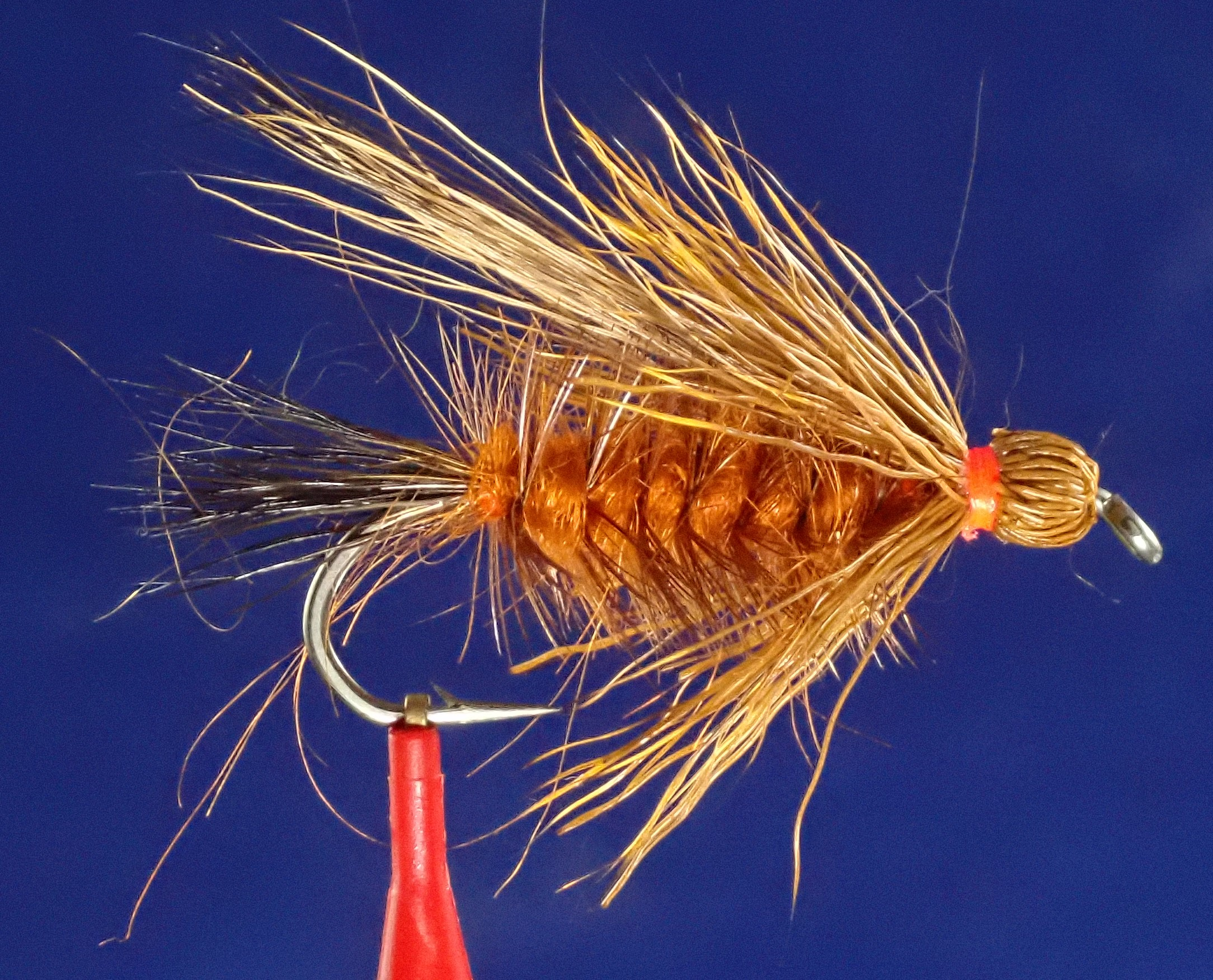
Henry's Fork Salmonfly

== Adult attractor patterns ==
As described in Flies for Trout (1993), Dick Stewart & Farrow Allen

- Stimulator

As described in Trout Country Flies (2002), Bruce Staples

- Abbey
- Dry Muddler
- Madam X
- Bloody Butcher
Adult Salmon fly Attractor Patterns
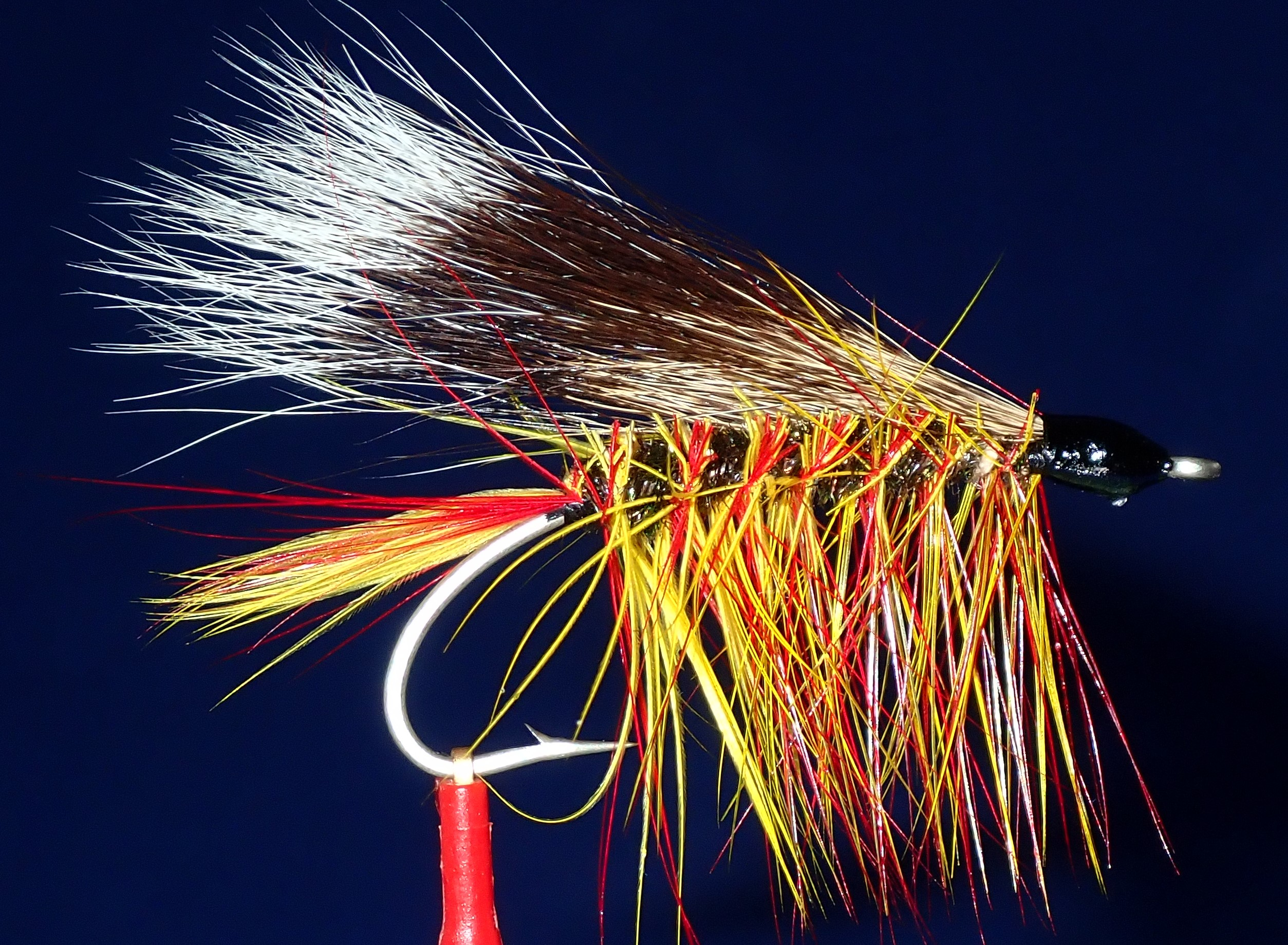
Bloody Butcher

== Nymph patterns ==
As described in Flies for Trout (1993), Dick Stewart & Farrow Allen
- Bett's Stonefly Nymph
- Box Canyon Stone
- Brook's Montana Stone
- Girdle Bug
- Kaufmann Black Stone
- Montana Nymph
- Rubber Legs
- Superfly Swannundaze Stonefly Nymph
- Terrible Troth
- Whitlock Black Stone

As described in Trout Country Flies (2002), Bruce Staples

- Bitch Creek Nymph
- Birdwell Woven Stonefly Nymph
- Chapman Stonefly Nymph
- Giant Black Nature Nymph
- Grove's Stonefly Nymph
- Jacklin Giant Stonefly Nymph
- Henry's Fork Stonefly Nymph
- Madison River Nymph
- Marabug
- Soufal
- Thexton Black Stone
- Wood's Super Stonefly

As described in Yellowstone Country Flies (2013), Walter J. Wiese

- Minch's Black Stone

As described in Fly Patterns-Tie Thousands of Flies (2008), Randall and Mary Kaufmann

- B-Yotch Creek, GB
- Brett's Black Stone
- Braided Stone, Delectable Flash Back Big Red
- FFS Brown Stone
- Schlotter's Dark Glimmer Stone
- Chocklett's Black Gummy Stone
Salmon fly Nymph Patterns
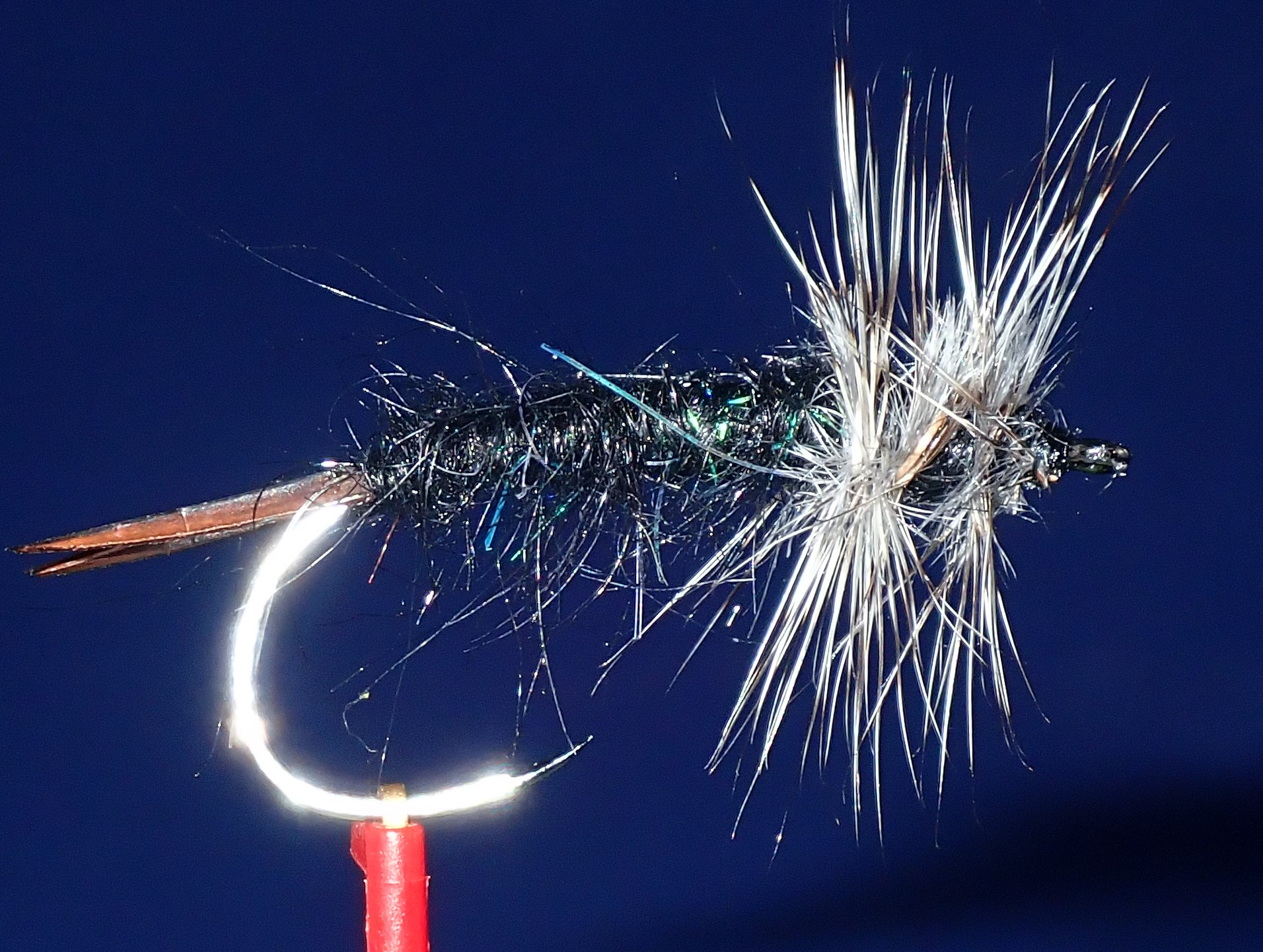
Brooks Montana Stone

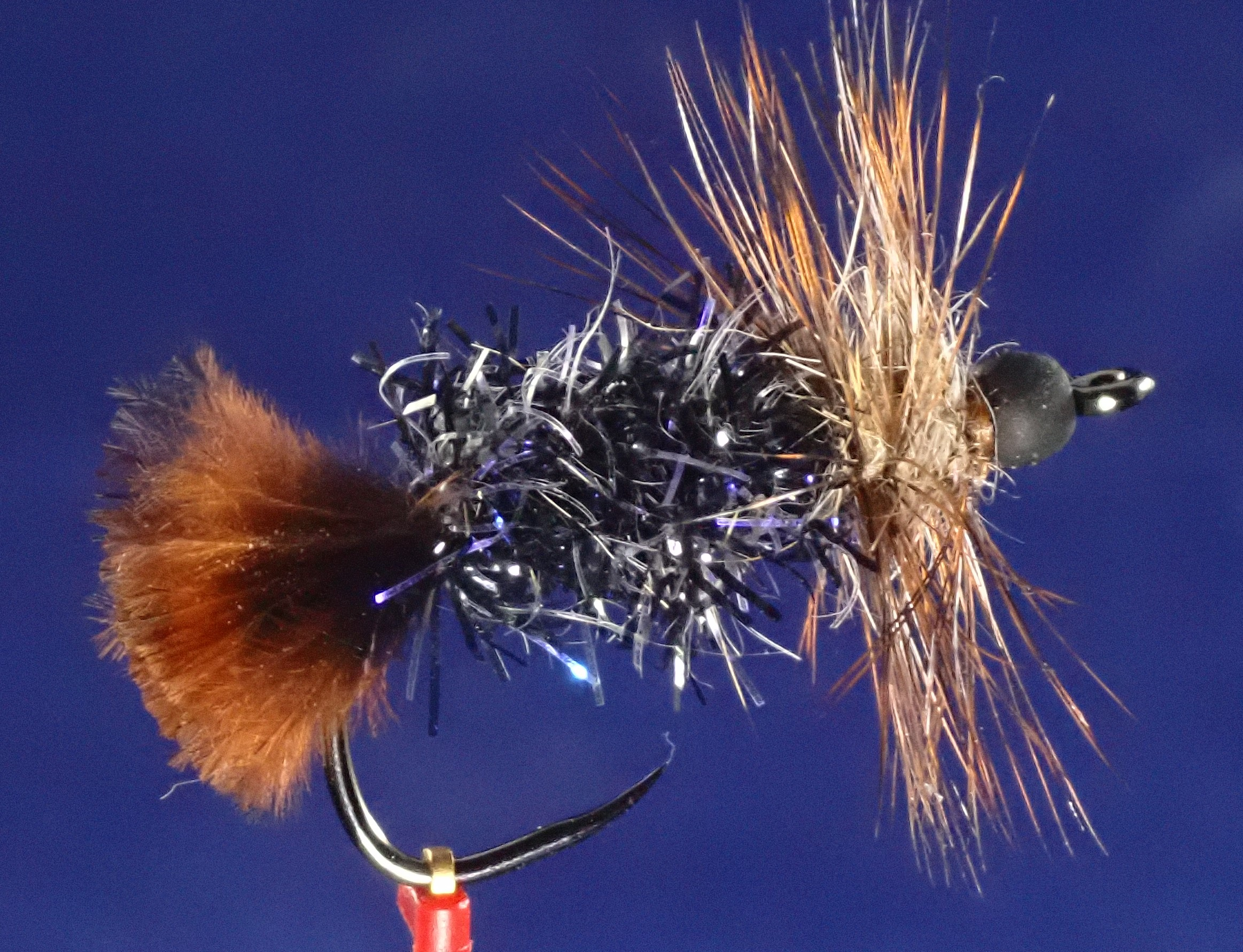
Minch's Black Stonefly Nymph

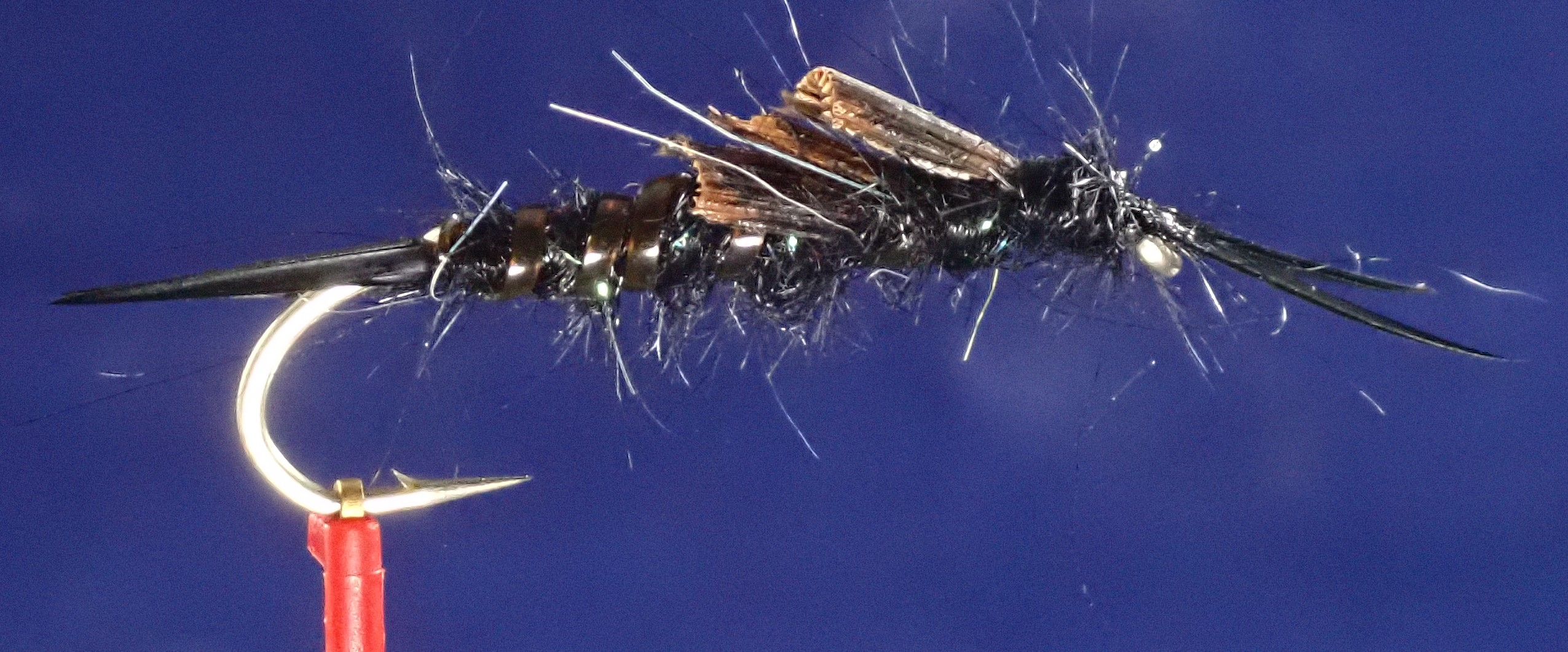
Kaufmann Black Stone

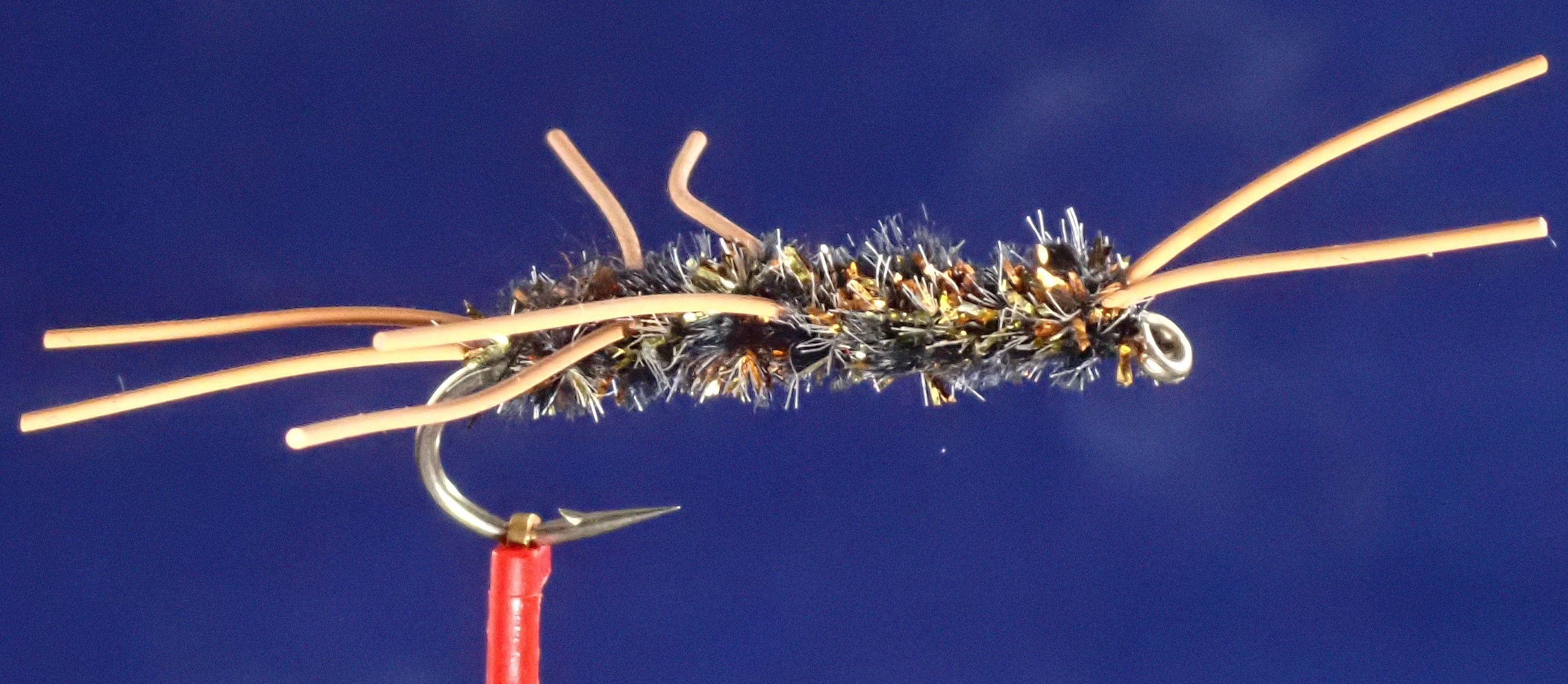
Rubber Legs

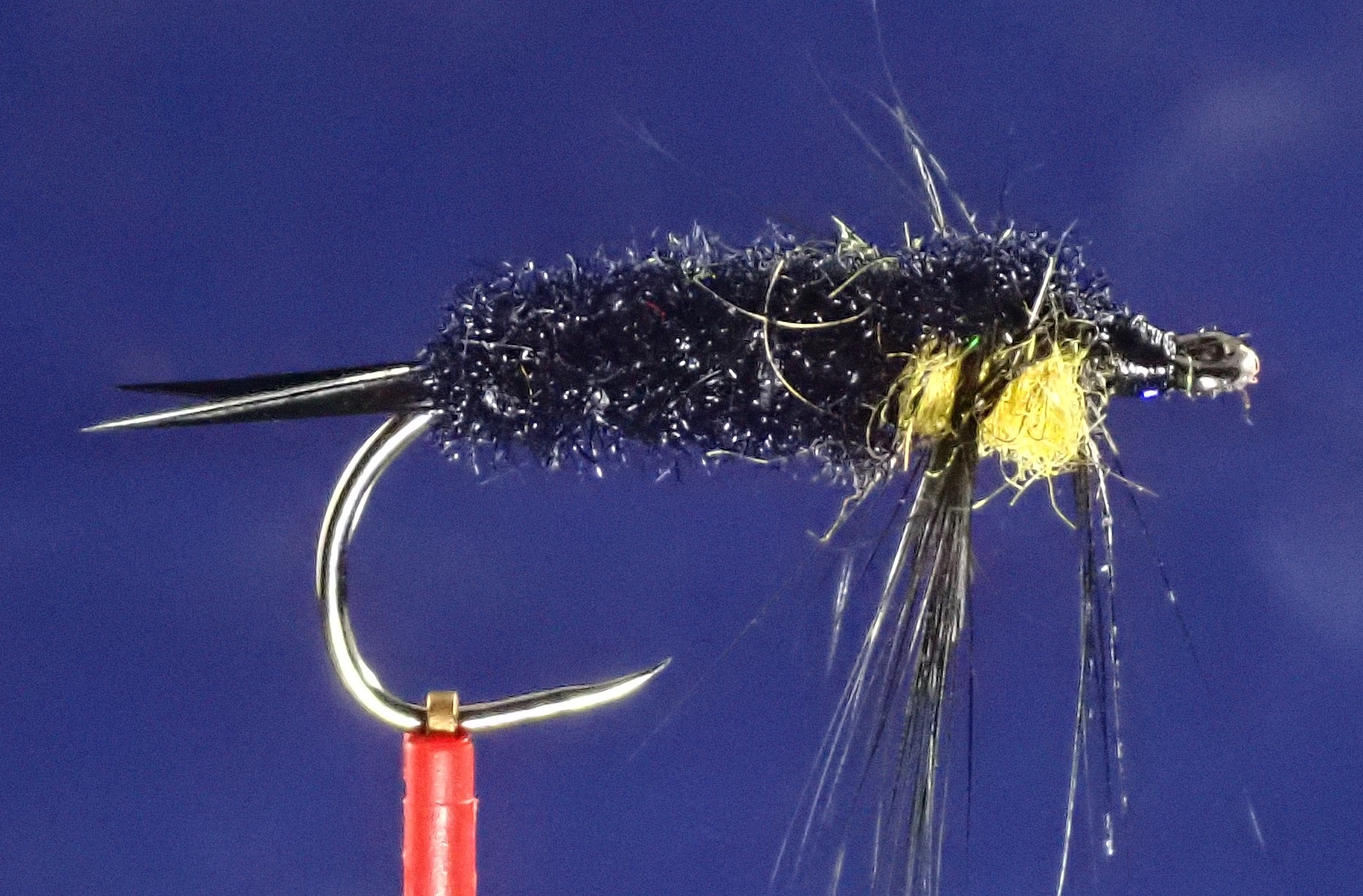
Montana Nymph

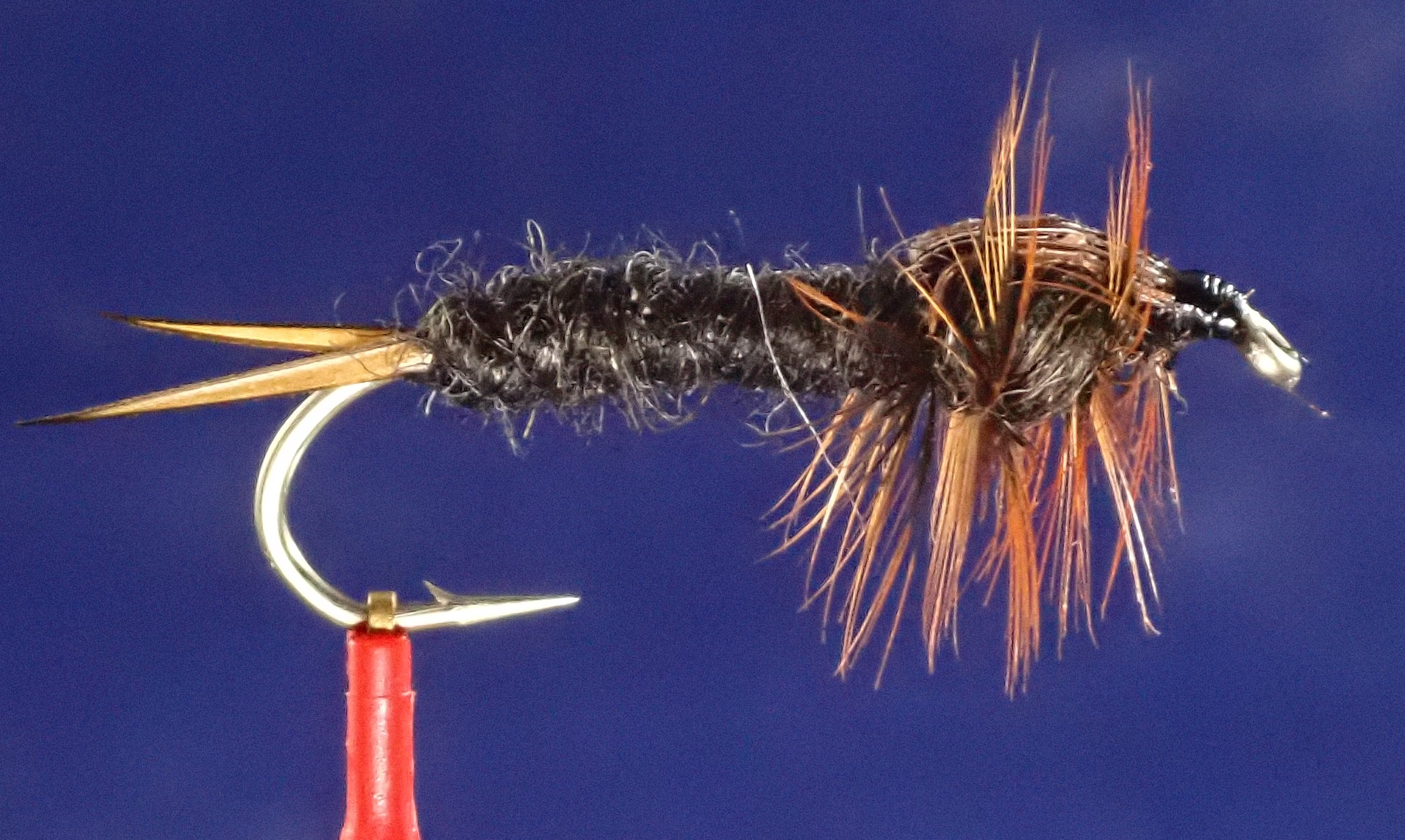
Box Canyon Stone

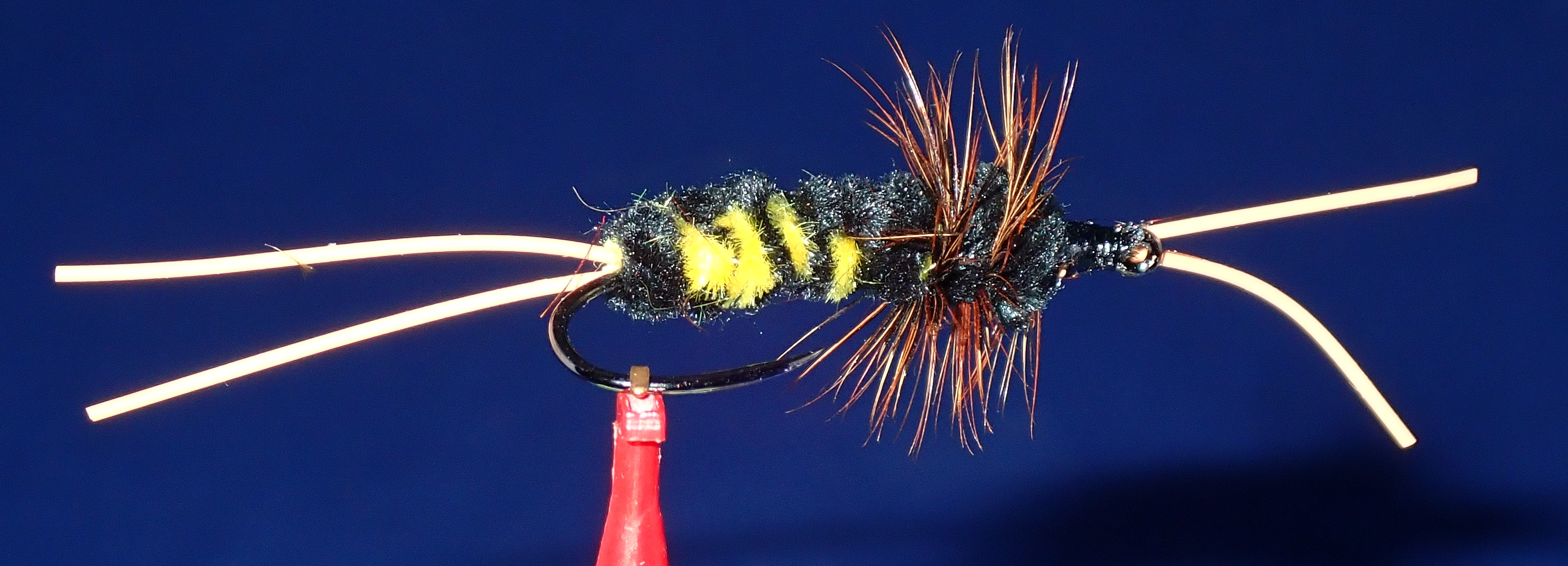
Bitch Creek Nymph
