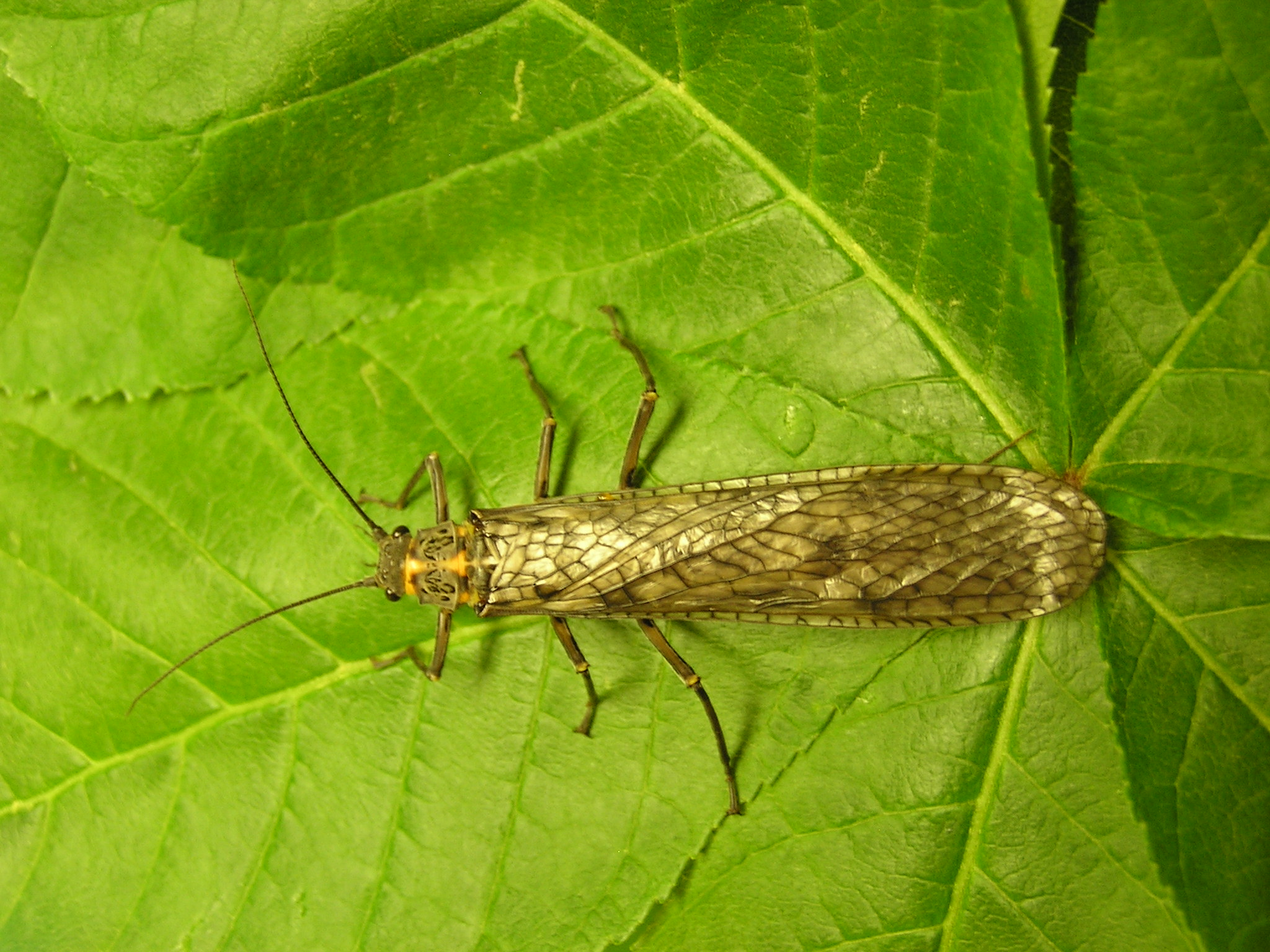

Scientific classification
- Domain: Eukaryota
- Kingdom: Animalia
- Phylum: Arthropoda
- Class: Insecta
- Order: Plecoptera
- Family: Pteronarcyidae
- Genus: Pteronarcys
- Species: P. dorsata

Binomial name
- Pteronarcys dorsata (Say, 1823)

= Pteronarcys dorsata =

Species of stonefly

Pteronarcys dorsata, the American salmonfly, is a species of giant stonefly in the family Pteronarcyidae. It is found in North America. Larvae feed on algae, but adults don't eat at all. They are known to release a noxious fluid from joints in the legs or play dead when menaced and are primarily nocturnal. Adults are active in spring and summer and the species is the biggest stonefly in North America.
