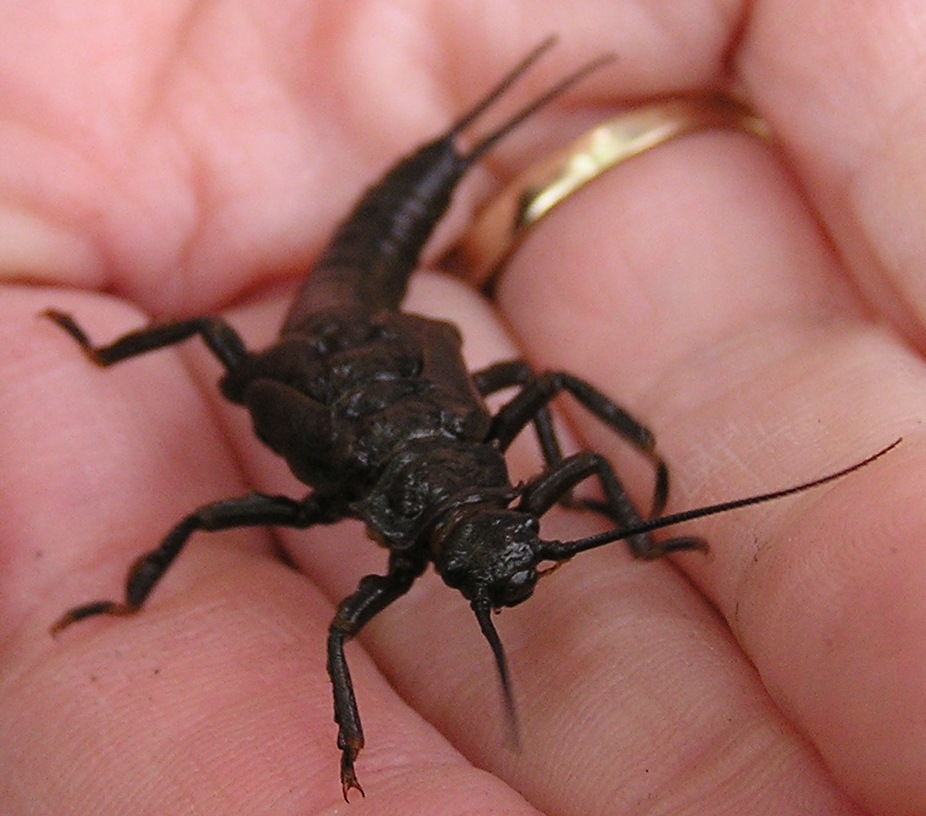

Scientific classification
- Domain: Eukaryota
- Kingdom: Animalia
- Phylum: Arthropoda
- Class: Insecta
- Order: Plecoptera
- Family: Pteronarcyidae
- Genus: Pteronarcys
- Species: P. pictetii

Binomial name
- Pteronarcys pictetii Hagen, 1873

= Pteronarcys pictetii =

Species of stonefly

Pteronarcys pictetii, the midwestern salmonfly, is a species of giant stonefly in the family Pteronarcyidae. It is found in North America.

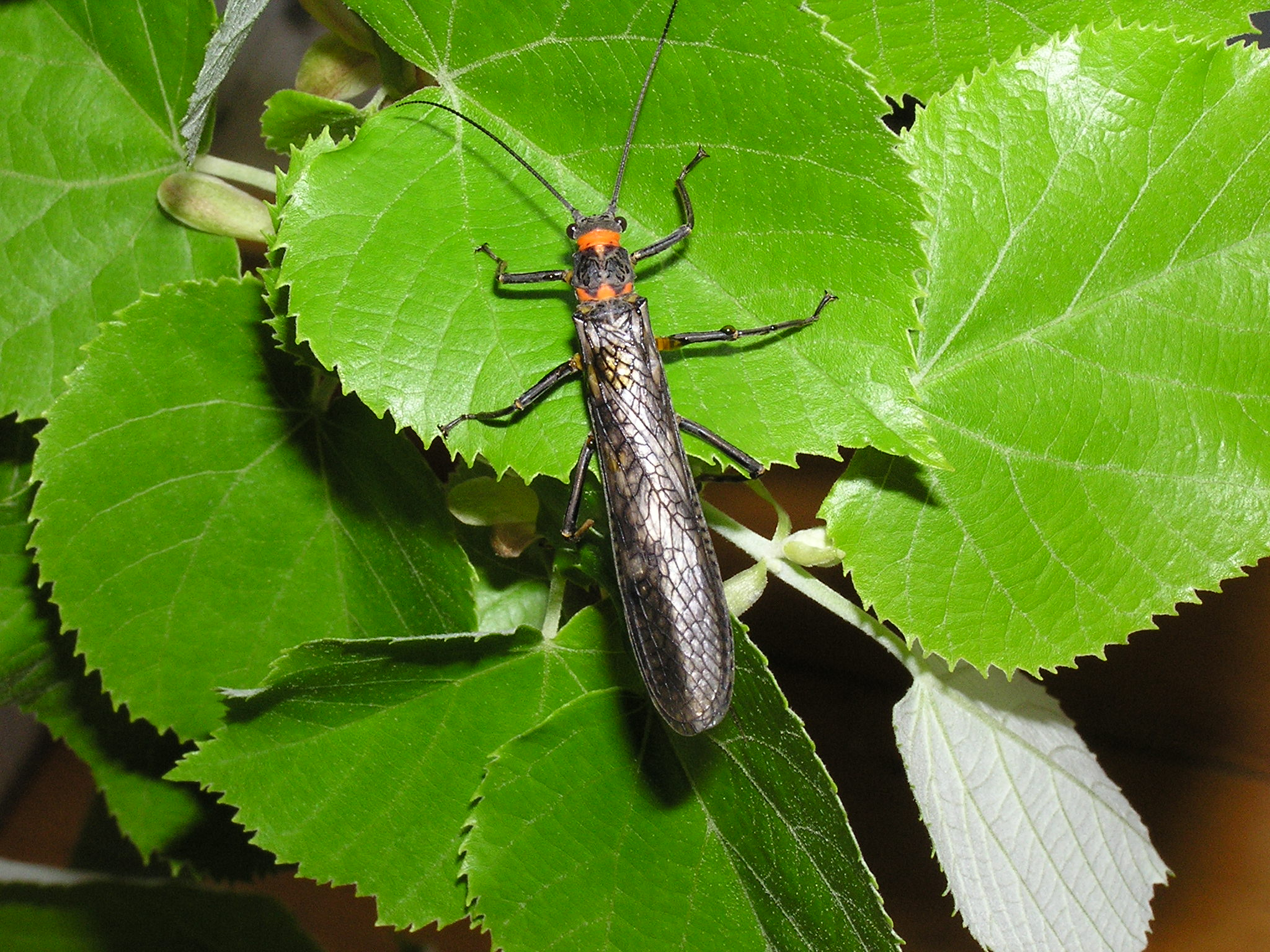
Midwestern salmonfly, Pteronarcys pictetii
