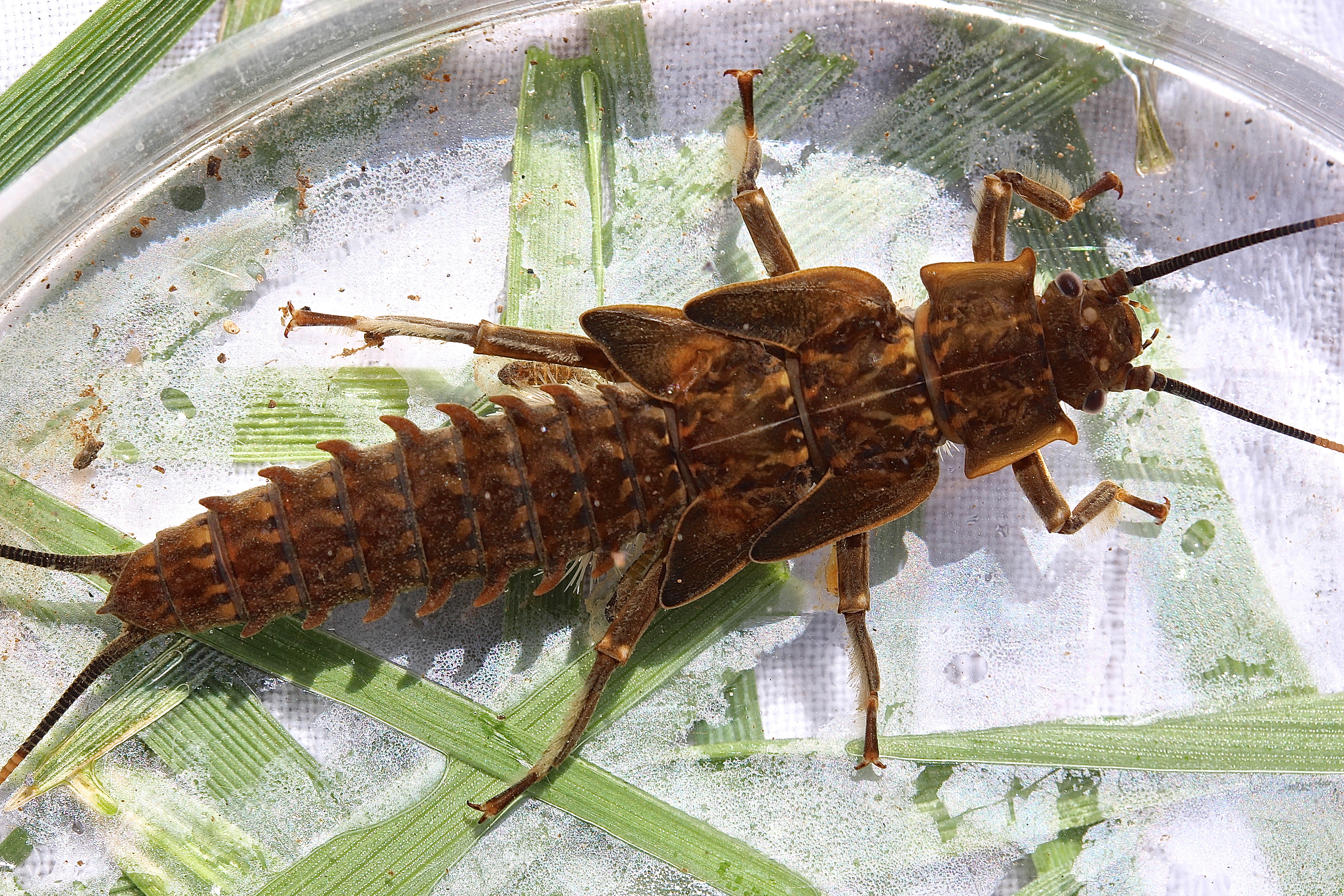

Scientific classification
- Domain: Eukaryota
- Kingdom: Animalia
- Phylum: Arthropoda
- Class: Insecta
- Order: Plecoptera
- Family: Pteronarcyidae
- Genus: Pteronarcys
- Species: P. biloba

Binomial name
- Pteronarcys biloba Newman, 1838

= Pteronarcys biloba =

Species of stonefly

Pteronarcys biloba, the knobbed salmonfly, is a species of giant stonefly in the family Pteronarcyidae. It is found in North America.
