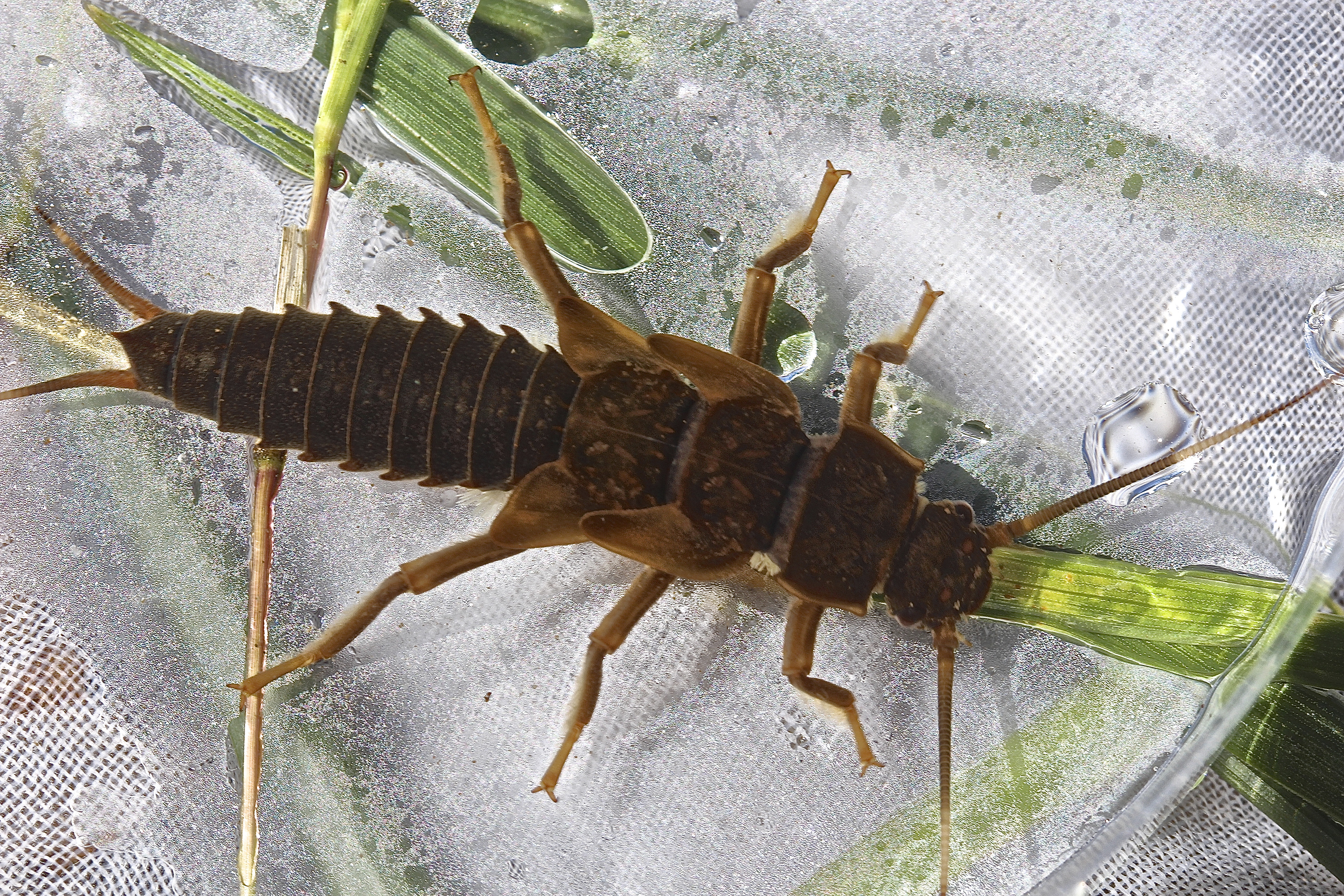

Scientific classification
- Domain: Eukaryota
- Kingdom: Animalia
- Phylum: Arthropoda
- Class: Insecta
- Order: Plecoptera
- Family: Pteronarcyidae
- Genus: Pteronarcys
- Species: P. proteus

Binomial name
- Pteronarcys proteus Newman, 1838

= Pteronarcys proteus =

Species of stonefly

Pteronarcys proteus, the Appalachian salmonfly, is a species of giant stonefly in the family Pteronarcyidae. It is found in North America.
