= Pteronarcella regularis =

Scientific classification
- Domain: Eukaryota
- Kingdom: Animalia
- Phylum: Arthropoda
- Class: Insecta
- Order: Plecoptera
- Family: Pteronarcyidae
- Genus: Pteronarcella
- Species: P. regularis

Binomial name
- Pteronarcella regularis (Hagen, 1874)

Species of stonefly

Pteronarcella regularis, the dwarf salmonfly, is a species of giant stonefly in the family Pteronarcyidae. It is found in North America.
