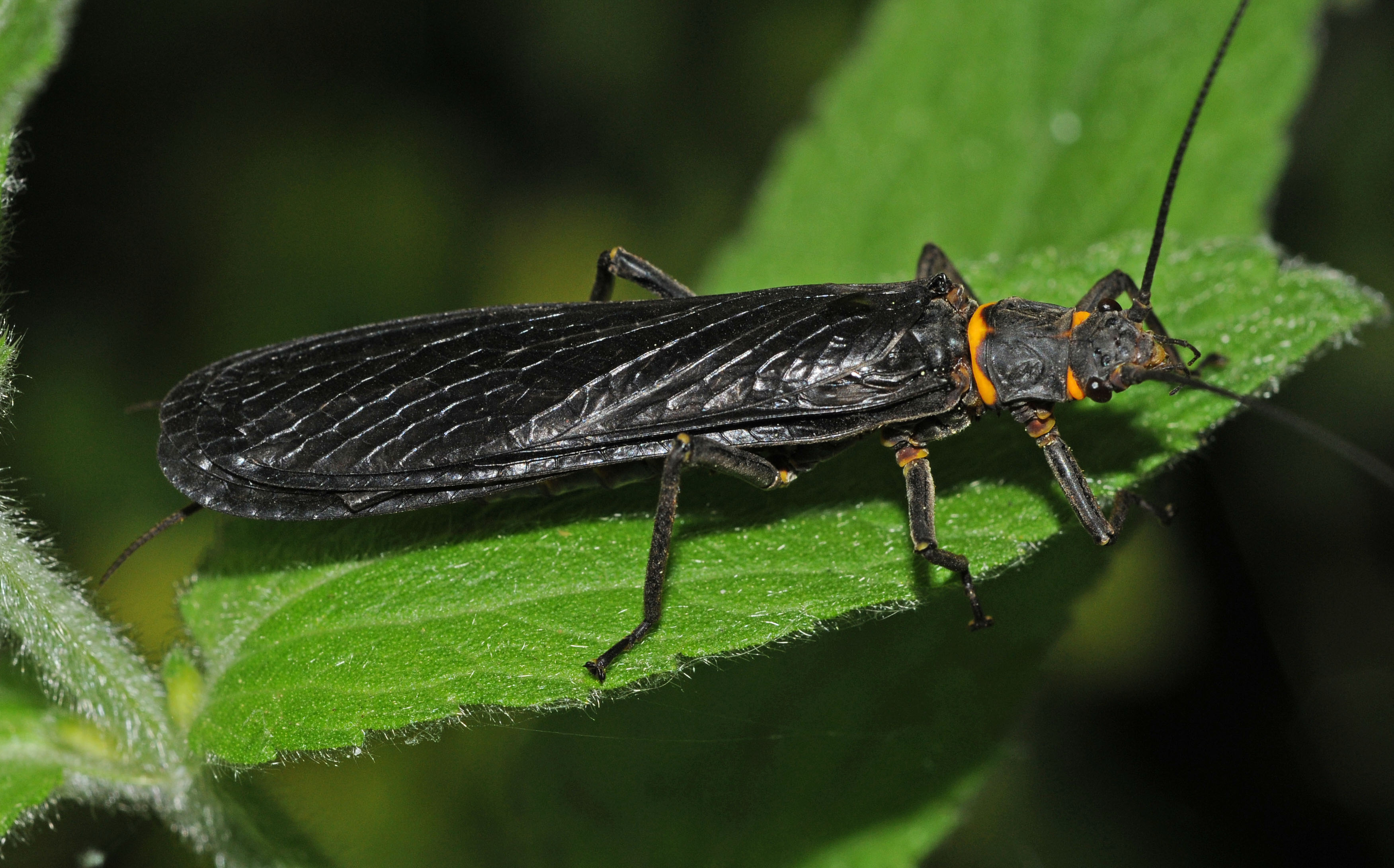

Scientific classification
- Domain: Eukaryota
- Kingdom: Animalia
- Phylum: Arthropoda
- Class: Insecta
- Order: Plecoptera
- Family: Pteronarcyidae
- Genus: Pteronarcys
- Species: P. princeps

Binomial name
- Pteronarcys princeps Banks, 1907

= Pteronarcys princeps =

Species of stonefly

Pteronarcys princeps, the ebony salmonfly, is a species of giant stonefly in the family Pteronarcyidae. It is found in North America.
