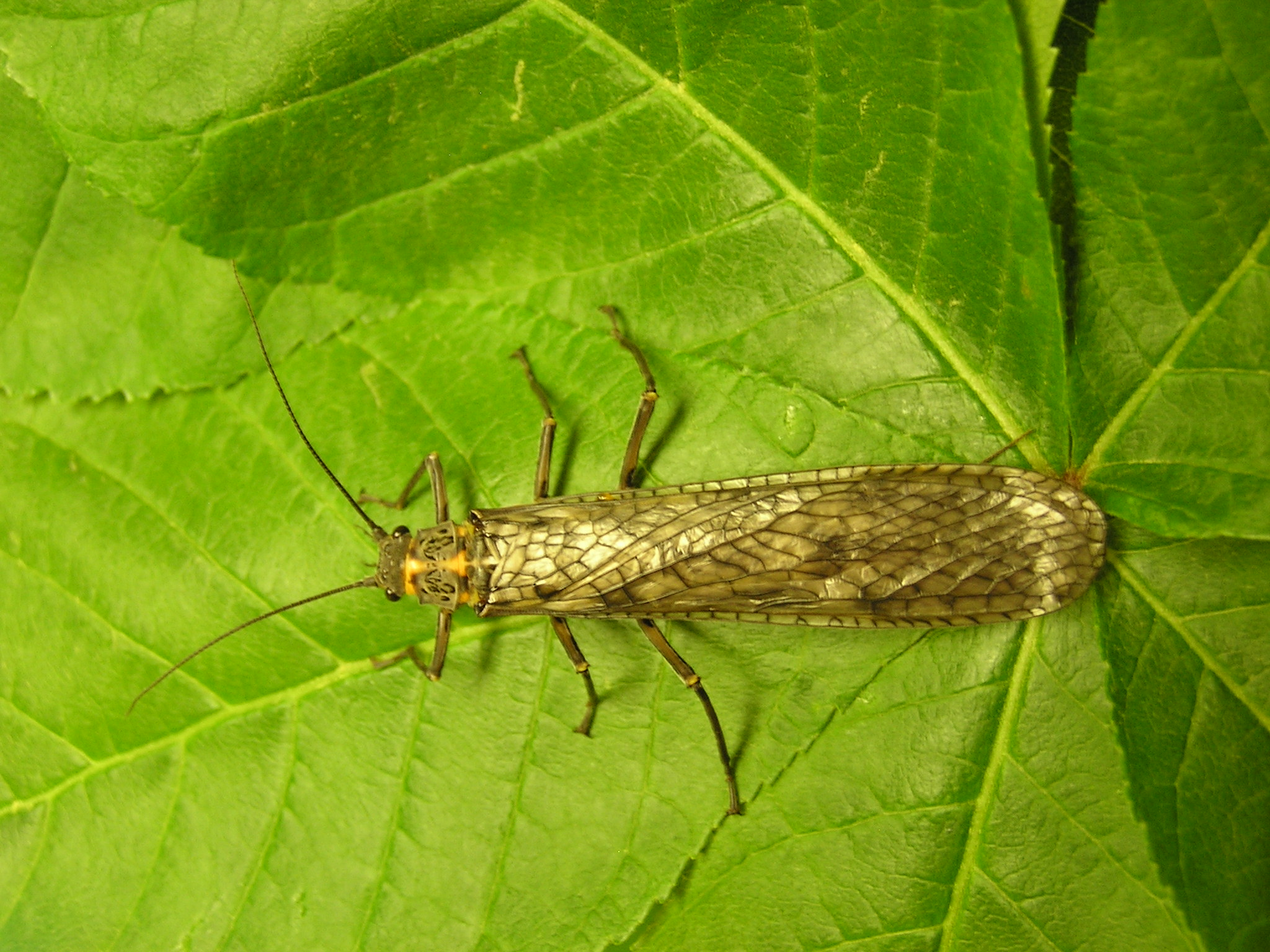
- Pteronarcys dorsata

Scientific classification
- Domain: Eukaryota
- Kingdom: Animalia
- Phylum: Arthropoda
- Class: Insecta
- Order: Plecoptera
- Family: Pteronarcyidae
- Tribe: Pteronarcyini
- Genus: Pteronarcys; Newman, 1838

Synonyms
- Allonarcys Needham and Claassen, 1925

= Pteronarcys =

Genus of stoneflies

Pteronarcys is a genus of giant stoneflies in the family Pteronarcyidae. There are about 8 described species in Pteronarcys.

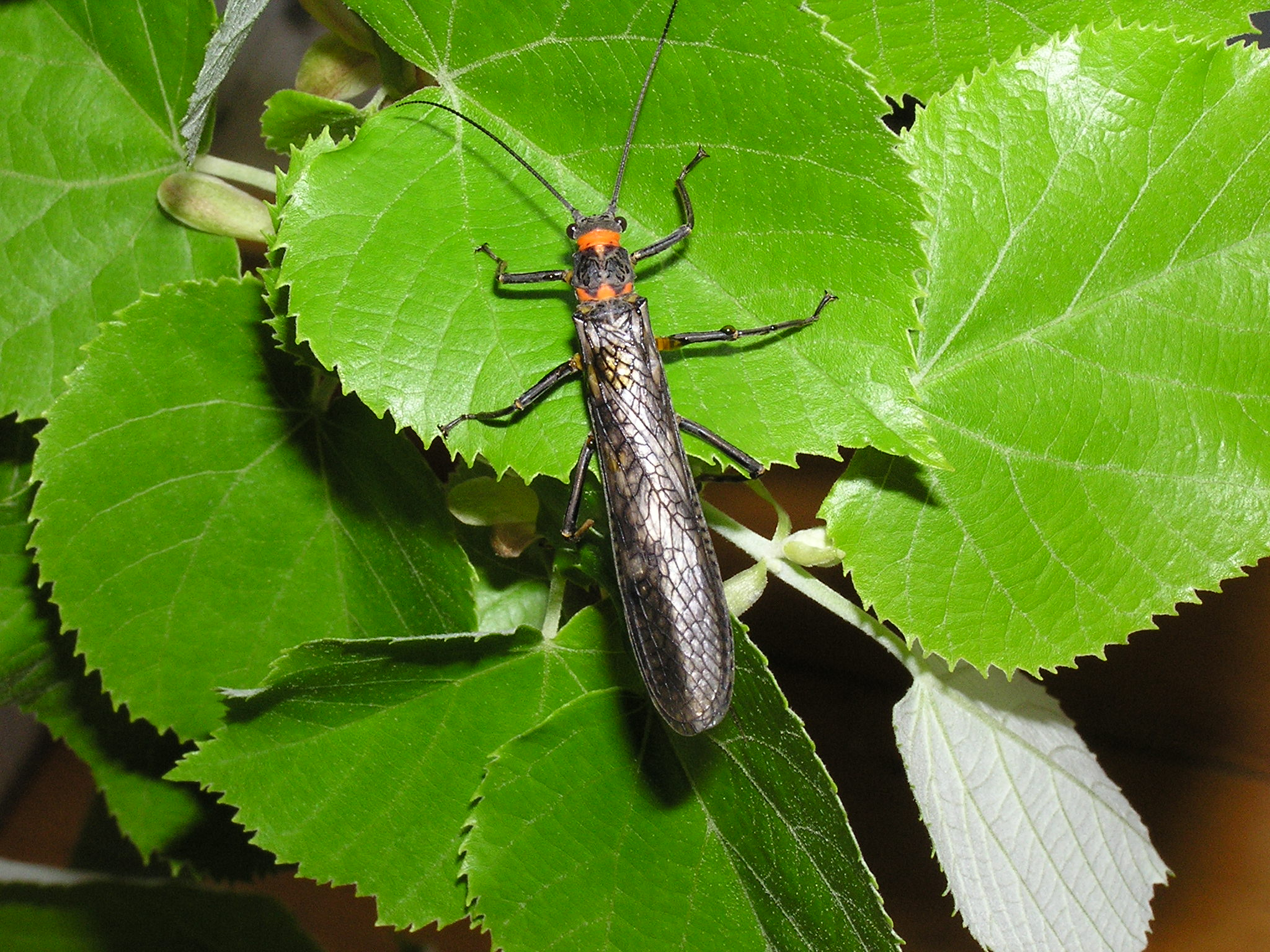
Pteronarcys pictetii

== Species ==
- Pteronarcys biloba Newman, 1838 (knobbed salmonfly)
- Pteronarcys californica Newport, 1848 (giant salmonfly)
- Pteronarcys comstocki Smith, 1917
- Pteronarcys dorsata (Say, 1823) (American salmonfly)
- Pteronarcys pictetii Hagen, 1873 (midwestern salmonfly)
- Pteronarcys princeps Banks, 1907 (ebony salmonfly)
- Pteronarcys proteus Newman, 1838 (Appalachian salmonfly)
- Pteronarcys scotti Ricker, 1952
