= Pteronarcella =

Scientific classification
- Domain: Eukaryota
- Kingdom: Animalia
- Phylum: Arthropoda
- Class: Insecta
- Order: Plecoptera
- Family: Pteronarcyidae
- Genus: Pteronarcella; Banks, 1900

Genus of stoneflies

Pteronarcella is a genus of giant stoneflies in the family Pteronarcyidae. There are at least two described species in Pteronarcella.

== Species ==
These two species belong to the genus Pteronarcella:

- Pteronarcella badia (Hagen, 1874) (least salmonfly)
- Pteronarcella regularis (Hagen, 1874) (dwarf salmonfly)
