= Bunyan Bug =

- Artificial fly
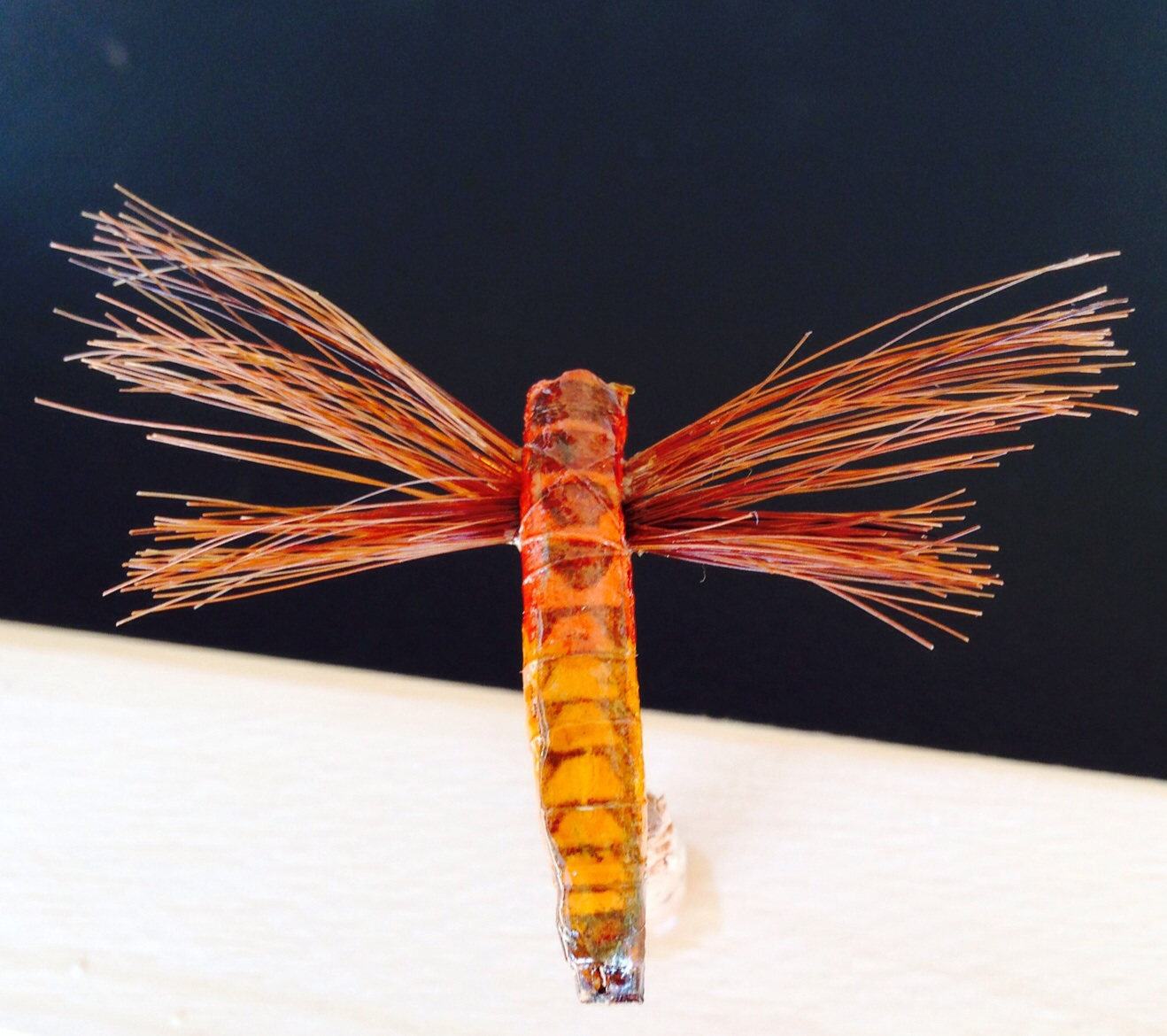
- Bunyan Bug (1923)
- Type: Dry fly
- Imitates: Stoneflies

History
- Creator: Norman Means
- Created: 1923
- Other names: Paul Bunyan

Materials
- Typical sizes: 2-6 Dry fly hook
- Body: Cork painted w/ tissue decal
- Wing: Horse hair

Uses
- Primary use: Trout

Bunyan Bugs are a series of artificial flies used in fly-fishing, designed to look like a wide variety of insects, including grasshoppers, stoneflies, Mayflies, horse flies, bumble bees, ants and caddisflies.

== Origin ==
The Saga of the Bunyan Bug by Norman Means described the origins of the Bunyan Bug:

"I caught my first trout at the age of five, and by twelve I was using dry flies. In 1921 I came to western Montana and found dry fly fishing for trout, the joy unsurpassed. I also found that here, the biggest trout were in rough, boiling white water, where the little dry fly didn’t have a chance. With many combinations of cork, hair and hand painted aquatic insect designs, I finally found that cork was the answer to this rough water. So, in 1923, the Bunyan Bug was conceived, made and used for the first time. The first Bunyan Bug was a far cry from the cork body aquatic insects that are used in many parts of the United States and Canada, today. The know-how to make a fly that would ride the white water being achieved, my next desire was to make these flies represent the various insects trout feed on. This has been a never ending observation. To make a long story short, I will list the most common insects for each month of fly insects for trout. Now, relative to this “each month,” please bear in mind that this is for elevations around 3,000 feet. At lower elevations the “hatch” will be earlier and at higher elevations later; about one month difference for each one thousand feet."

== History ==
"Bunyan Bugs" were designed by fly-tier and split bamboo fly rod maker Paul Bunyan (aka Norman Means) circa 1927, and originated in Montana. The construction of the Bunyan Bug is unique and has no parallel among other Montana or western trout flies. Norman's grandson, Richard Rose has kept alive a legend that Bunyan Bugs have caught mammoth trout and bass on the western rivers of the Rocky Mountains. His Bunyan Bugs have now become very collectable. Gathering the right materials to construct a Bunyan Bug is difficult, as is having the knowledge and patience required to make them. The Bunyan Bug was never tied like conventional flies. Imitation versions of the Bunyan Bug that have been tied like conventional flies have no value or represent the history of this dry fly. Today Bunyan Bugs are very rare and collectible.

== Design ==
FlyAnglersOnline notes "The first Bunyan Bugs appeared in about 1929, and were all hand painted. Later, production models were made with a decal (fine tissue) which was lacquered in place making the paper disappear, leaving just the image."

According to Montana Trout Flies by George Grant, the materials are:

- Hook: "Size 4, heavy-wire, shank length about 1 1/4, also made with size 2 hook."
- Cork Body: "Just about same length as hook shank. Generally round but slightly flattened on both sides and bottom."
- Color: "Stained or painted deep orange. Segmented markings can be applied with permanent ink pens both top and bottom. Use black or dark brown ink."
- Wings: "Hair from horse mane, blonde or light sandy, inserted into front end of body so that wings will lie flat and spent."
- Tying note: "Body with wings cemented in slit, should be slit (not very deep) lengthwise and placed on top of hook so that almost all of the cork body is on top."
- "A strong tying thread, attached to the hook shank prior to positioning the cork body, will now be wound firmly at segment marking to firmly seat the body on the shank."
- "Use of strong adhesives in seating both wings and body will assist in keeping all parts in proper position."
- "Tying thread should be fastened off ahead of the wings with a whip finish. Coat entire body with clear varnish."
Bunyan Bugs
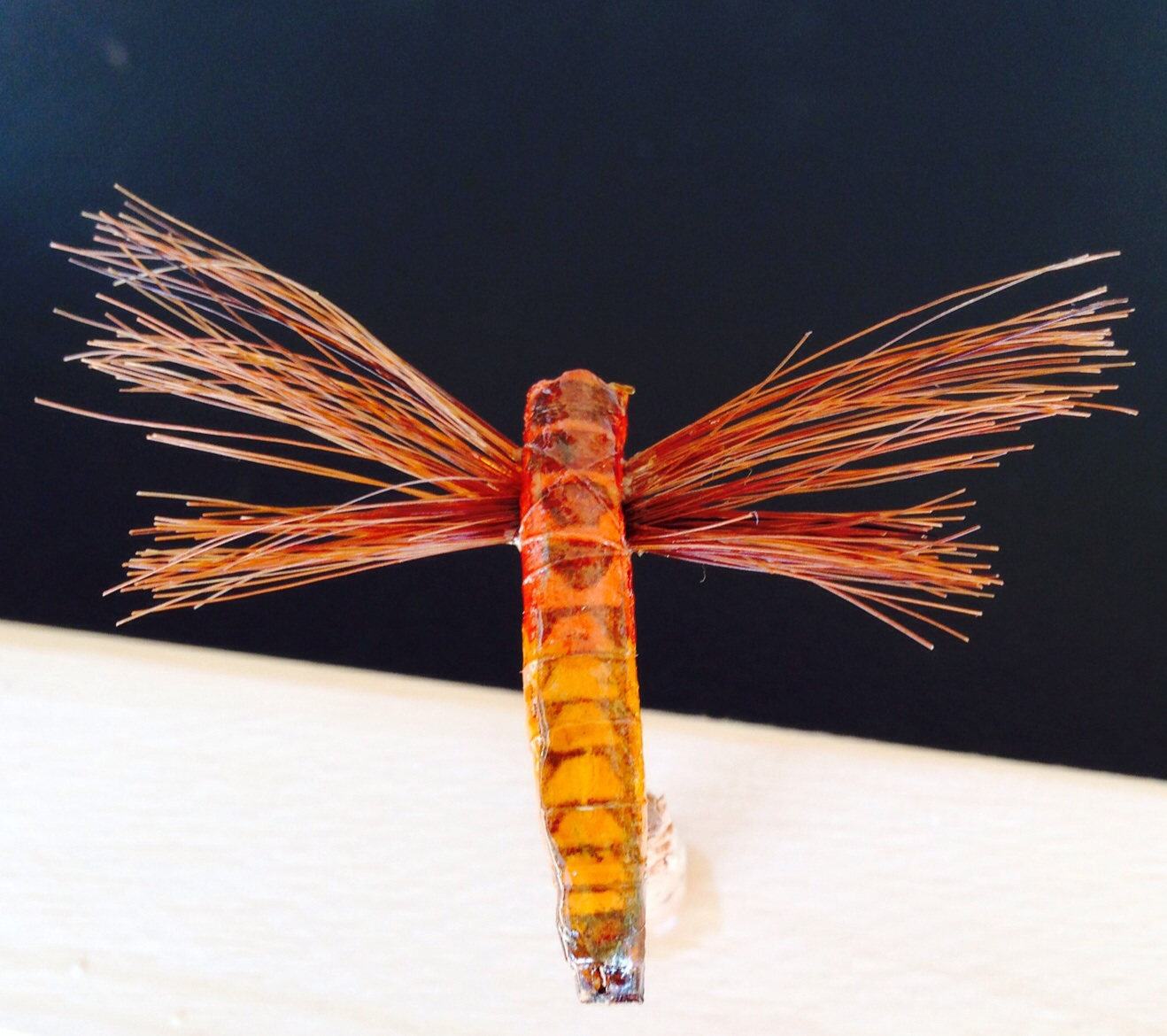
Orange Stone Fly

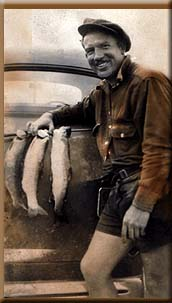
Norman Means

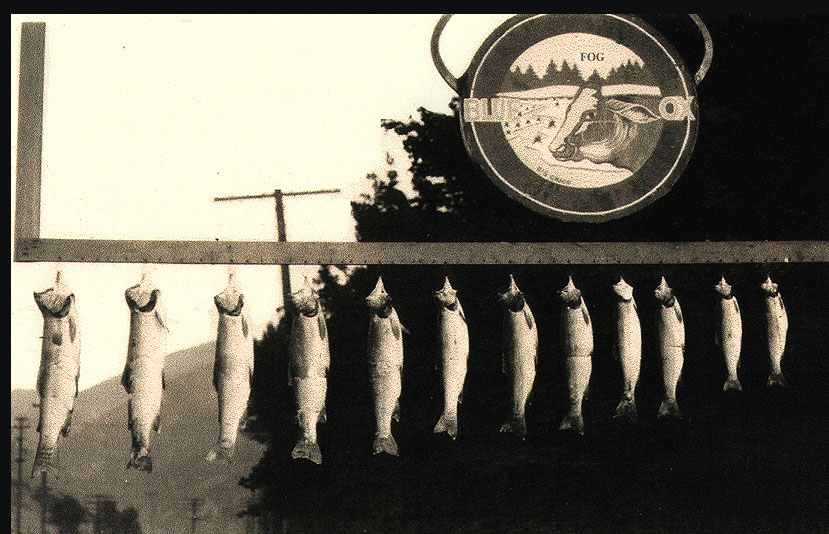
Paul Bunyan Fishing Tackle

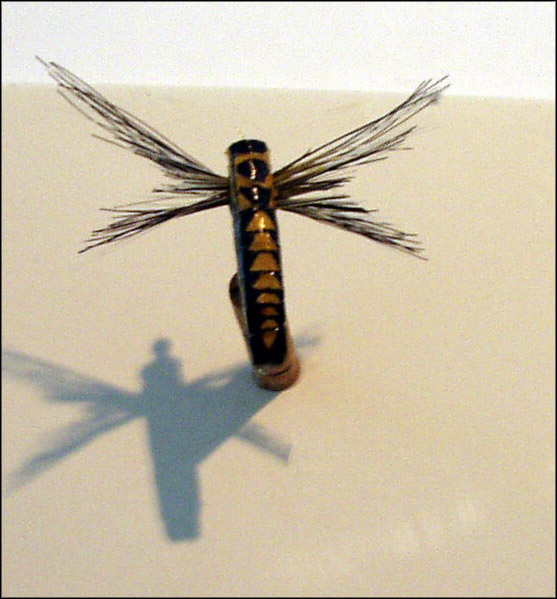
Yellowstone Fly

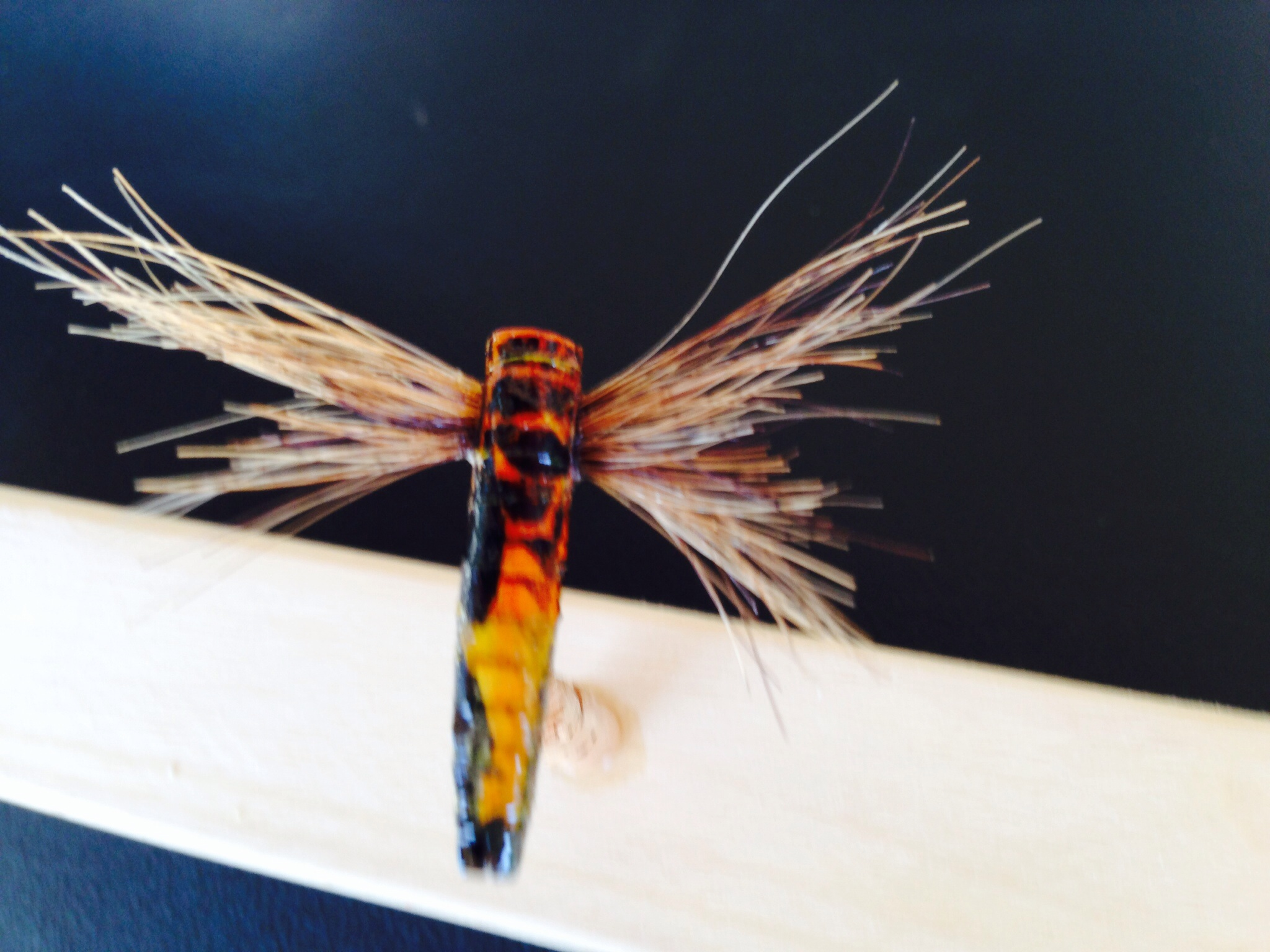
Male Orange Stone Fly

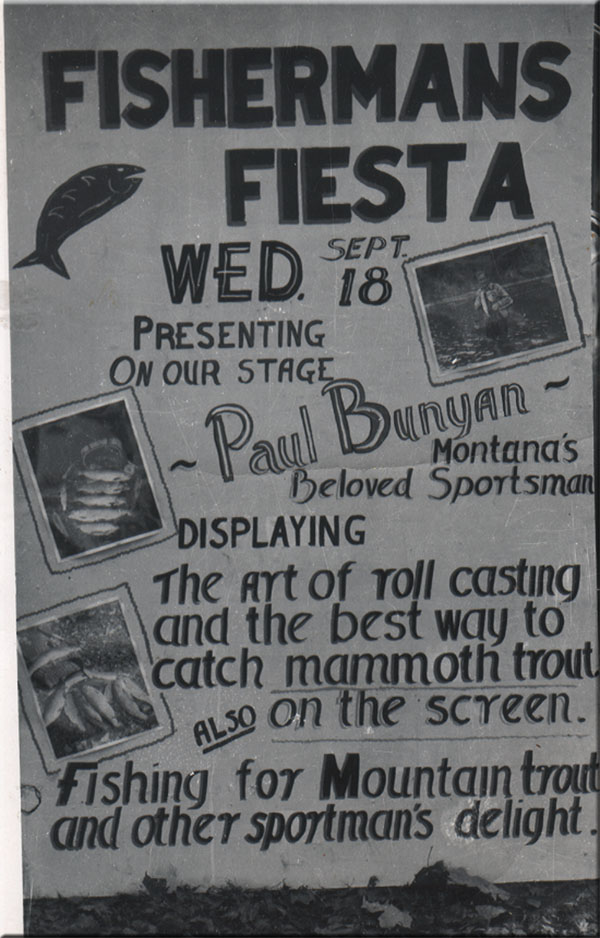
Fishermans Fiesta Poster
