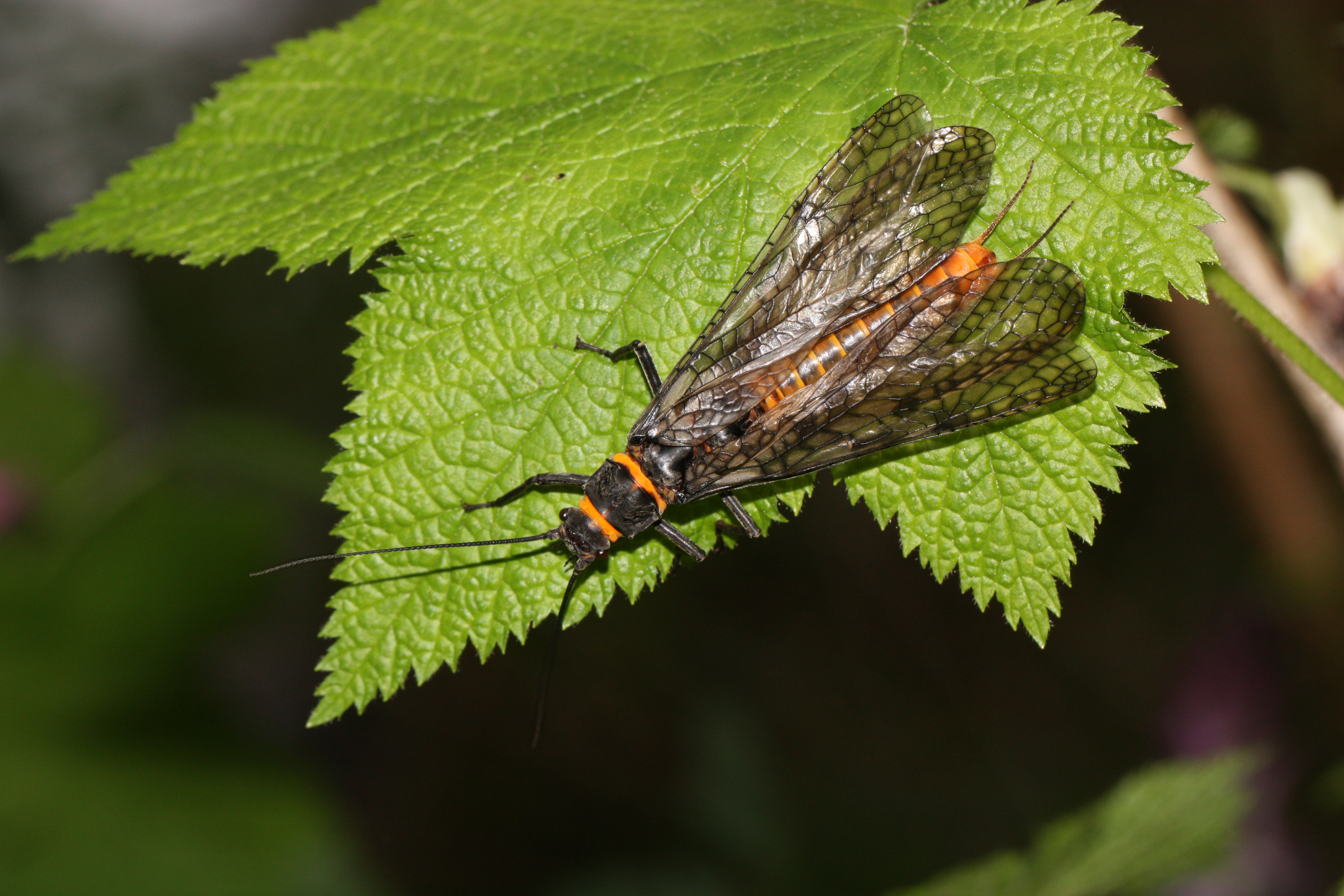
- Adult Pteronarcys californica

Conservation status
- Secure (NatureServe)

Scientific classification
- Kingdom: Animalia
- Phylum: Arthropoda
- Clade: Pancrustacea
- Class: Insecta
- Order: Plecoptera
- Family: Pteronarcyidae
- Genus: Pteronarcys
- Species: P. californica

Binomial name
- Pteronarcys californica Newport, 1848

= Pteronarcys californica =

Species of stonefly

Pteronarcys californica is a species of insect in the family Pteronarcyidae, the giant stoneflies and salmonflies. It is known commonly as a salmonfly. Salmonflies are an important aquatic insect for fly anglers and many nymph and adult fly patterns are tied to imitate this insect.

== Characteristics ==
Pteronarcys californica nymphs, or larvae, can grow to lengths in excess of 5 centimetres (2 in). The nymphs' dorsal side (back) is dark in colour, although their ventral side (belly) is lighter. The colouring can vary, and subtle patterns are occasionally found on the abdomen. They are detritivores, eating stream debris partially broken down by other organisms. They are "shredders" as a functional feeding group, breaking down large bits of detritus down into smaller ones while feeding. The adults are also large, and the abdomen, leg joints, and several thorax joints are a bright orange colour. Two pairs of large wings, kept flat against the body when at rest, are longer than the body. The adult carries its eggs at the end of the abdomen and look like a cluster of orange salmon eggs.

== Range and habitat ==
Pteronarcys californica is found across western North America, from British Columbia to California. They live in higher-velocity streams and rivers, on medium to large-sized unconsolidated substrates.

== Emergence ==
The nymphs live three to four years in the water before emergence. Immediately prior to emerging, the nymphs congregate near the shoreline in shallow water on partially exposed rocks. About one month before emergence Pteronarcys californica nymphs start migrating from the center of the river to the shoreline making them more susceptible to predation. To emerge, the nymphs crawl from the water to rocks or the shore, and split the nymphal exoskeleton. The adults emerge from the exuviae ready to mate.

The emergence is also followed closely by fly-fishermen, and is one of the highlights of the spring fishing season.

== Gallery ==
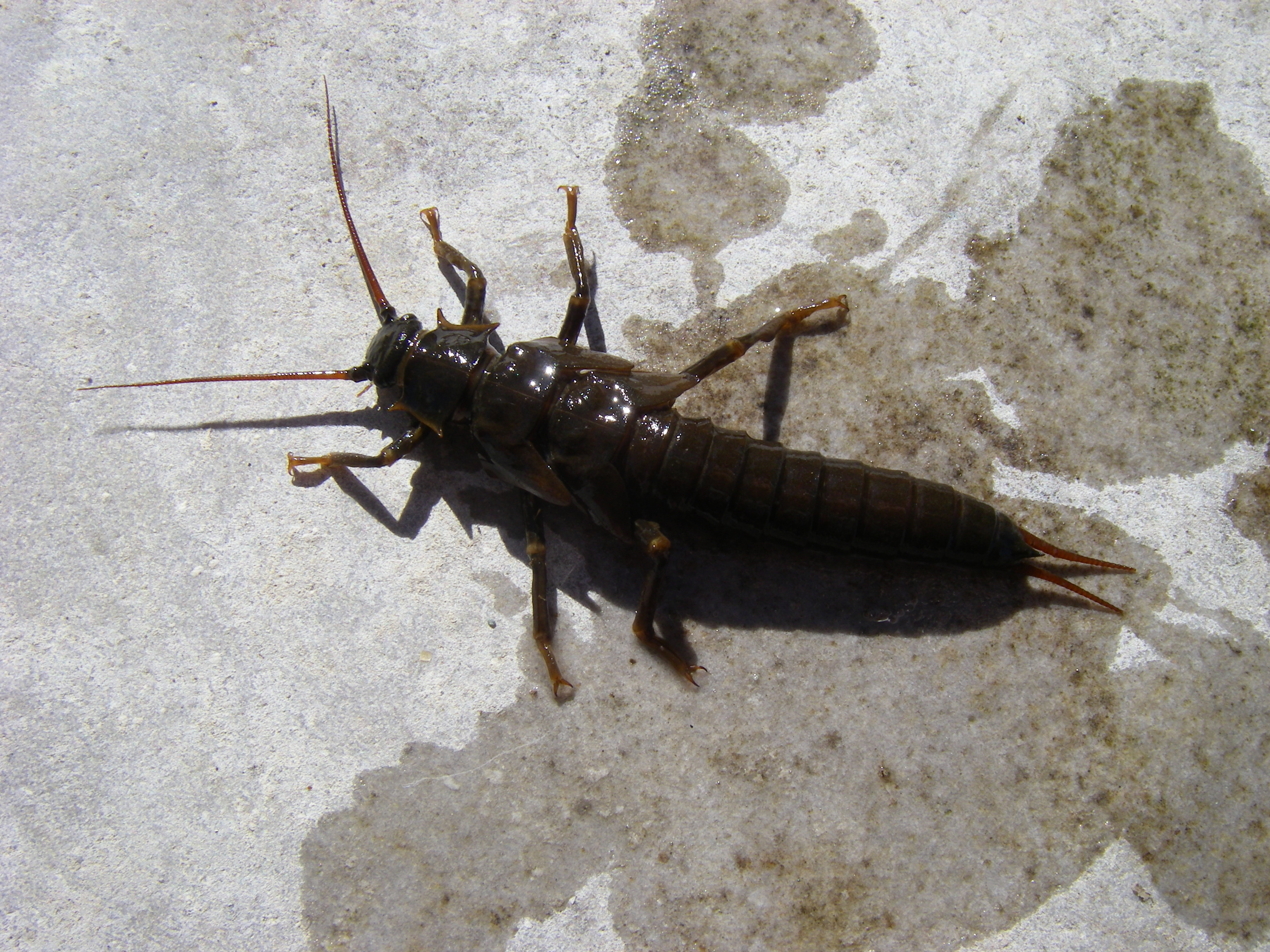
Pteronarcys californica nymph

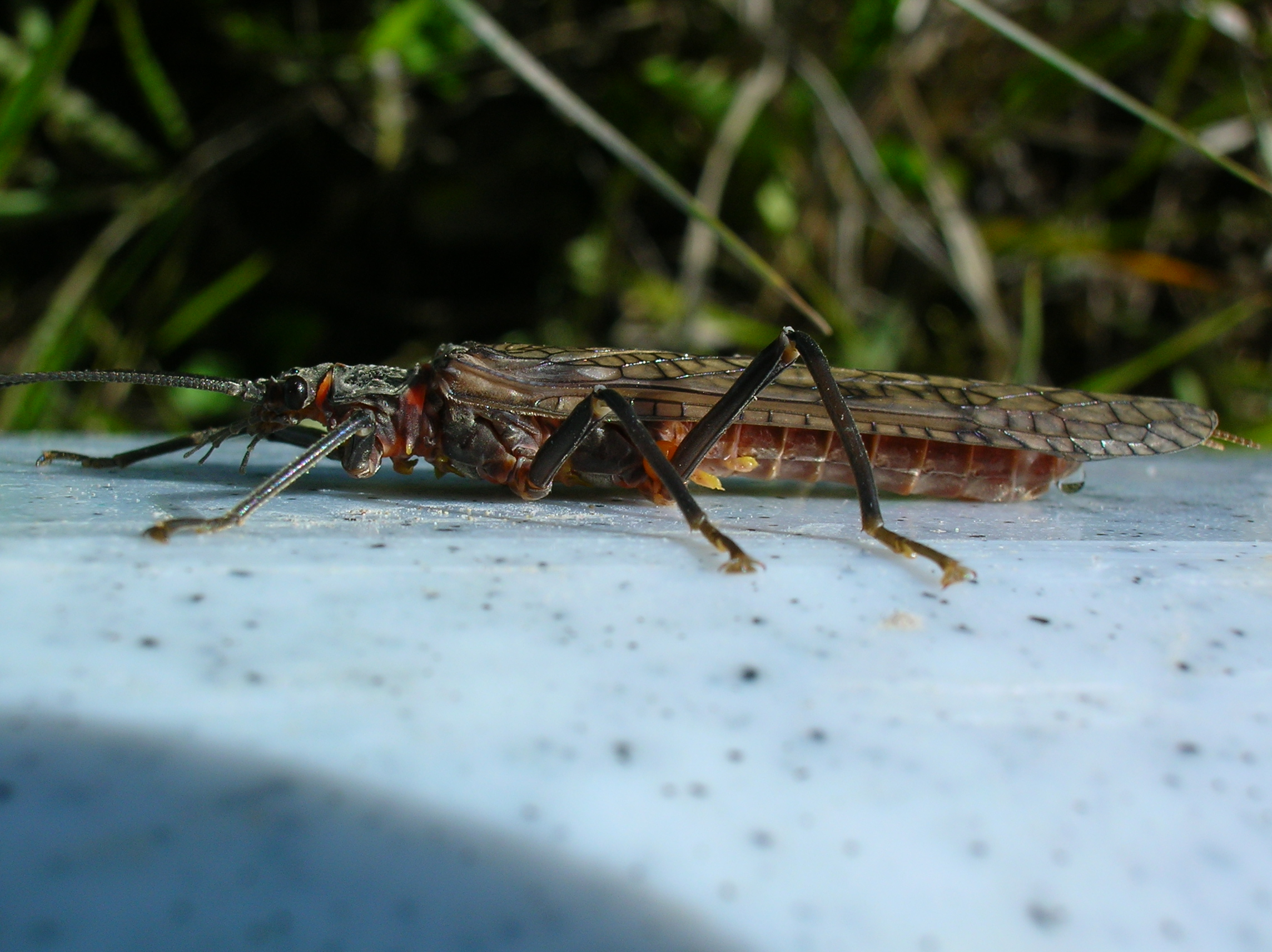
Adult Pteronarcys californica

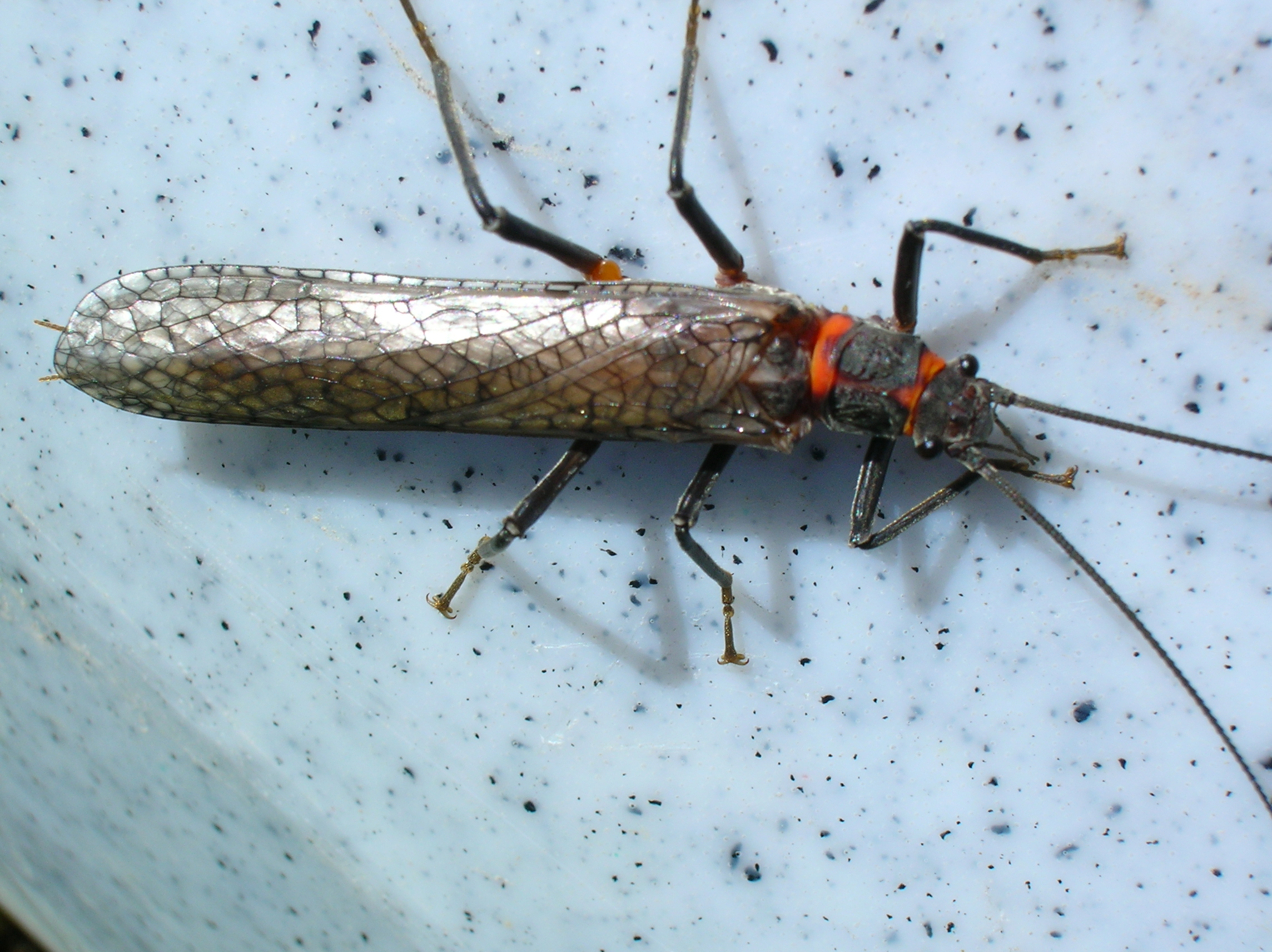
Adult Pteronarcys californica

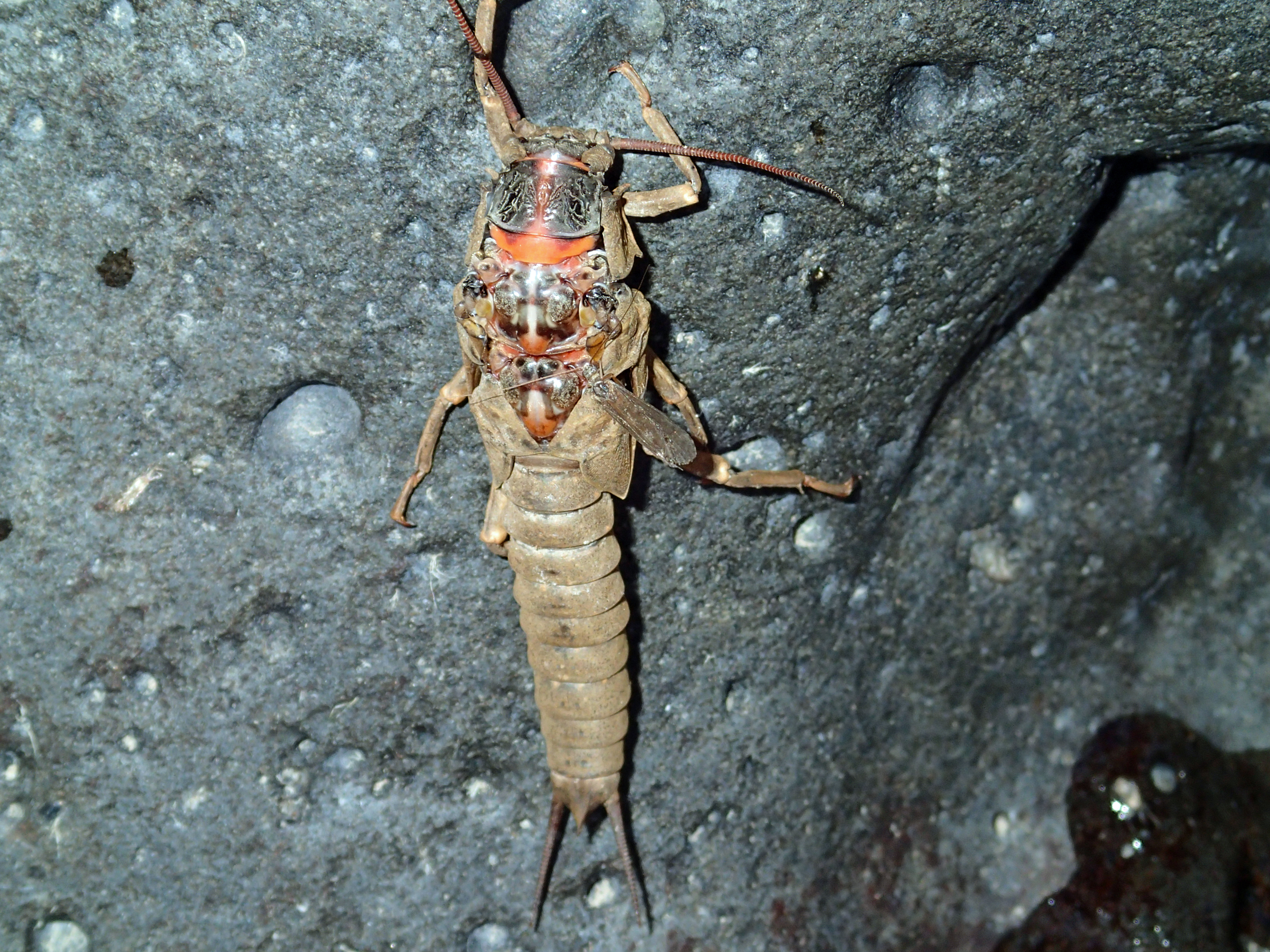
Emerging from nymphal husk

== See also ==
- List of largest insects
