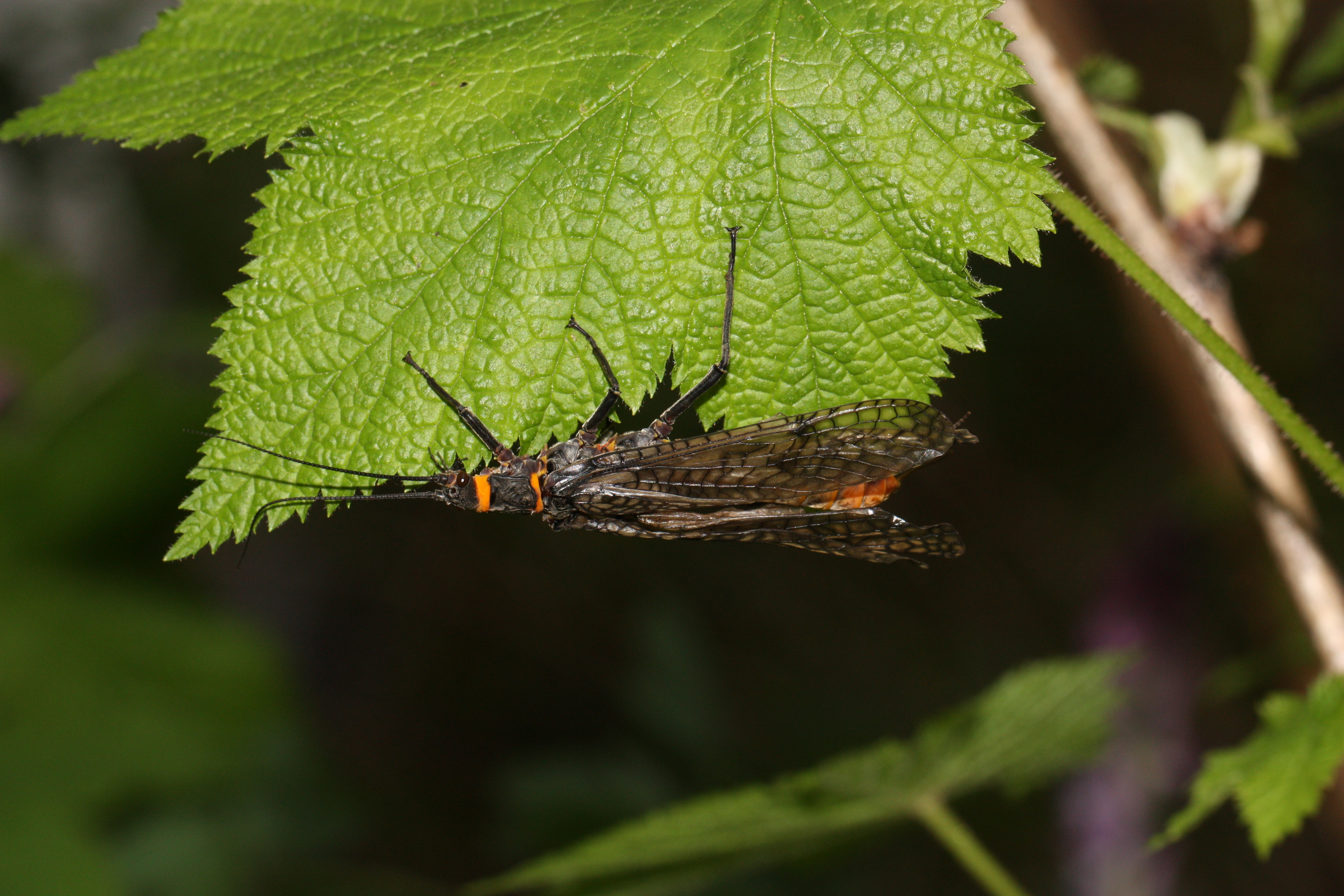
- Adult Pteronarcys californica, a member of family Pteronarcyidae

Scientific classification
- Kingdom: Animalia
- Phylum: Arthropoda
- Clade: Pancrustacea
- Class: Insecta
- Cohort: Polyneoptera
- Order: Plecoptera
- Superfamily: Pteronarcyoidea
- Family: Pteronarcyidae; Newman, 1853

Genera
- Pteronarcys; Pteronarcella

= Pteronarcyidae =

Pteronarcyidae Temporal range: Middle Jurassic–Recent

Family of stoneflies

The Pteronarcyidae, also known as giant stoneflies or salmonflies, are a family of the order Plecoptera.

== Natural history ==
Two genera of Pteronarcyidae are found; Pteronarcys is found in all of North America, while Pteronarcella is found only in the west. The two genera comprise 10 distinct species, two of which are Pteronarcella. Lifespans range from one to four years. The name "salmonflies" comes from their role in the diets of salmon, and they play an important role in fly fishing. Adults emerge from April to June. The giant stoneflies are very sensitive to stress.

== Habit and habitat ==
They live in a lotic-erosional habitat. Larvae of giant stoneflies live in cool streams of small to medium size, in leaf and woody debris packs. They prefer swift riffles between cobbles and boulders. Although the Pteronarcyidae are primarily shredders-detritivores, some facultative scrapers occur. They chew and mine through leaf litter. They are intolerant to loss of coarse particulate organic matter that is their food and habitat.

== Movement and other biology ==
They are classified as crawlers. The larvae move very slowly and pretend to be dead when disturbed. They move their abdomens from side to side when under respiratory duress.

== Evolutionary history ==
A fossil genus, Pteroliriope is known from the Middle Jurassic of Daohugou, China.
