= Gun Talk (radio program) =

- Other names: Tom Gresham's Gun Talk
- Running time: 3 hours
- Country of origin: United States
- Language(s): English
- Syndicates: Talk Shows USA
- Starring: Tom Gresham
- Other studios: Cascade, Idaho
- Original release: 1995 – present
- Website: guntalk.com
- Podcast: guntalk.libsyn.com

Gun Talk (also known as Tom Gresham's Gun Talk) is an American syndicated radio program hosted by Tom Gresham. It currently runs on 270+ radio stations across the United States. Debuting in 1995, the show covers topics including firearms, shooting, hunting, and gun policy. The show broadcasts from Mandeville, Louisiana.

Host Tom Gresham is a son of Grits Gresham, who hosted the ABC TV show The American Sportsman from 1966 to 1979. Gresham described his show in a 2013 interview with Politico as "Car Talk about guns, with politics thrown in." Gresham has been a writer, editor and photographer for 50 years, and has held editor positions at a number of national magazines including "American Hunter," "Alaska Magazine," "Outdoor Life," "Rifle," and "Handloader." He also has created, produced, directed and hosted a number of television series, including "Personal Defense TV," "Gun Venture," "Guns and Gear," "Wings To Adventure," and "Shooting Sports America."
