= Joe Brooks (fly fisherman) =

American fly fisherman and writer

- Born: Joseph White Brooks; 1901; Baltimore, Maryland
- Died: September 20, 1972; Rochester, Minnesota
- Occupations: Fly fisherman, Angling writer
- Known for: Development of 20th century American fly fishing

Joseph White Brooks (1901 – September 20, 1972) was an American fly fisherman and popular writer about the sport of fly fishing during the mid-20th century. He was born in Baltimore, Maryland, in 1901 and died in Rochester, Minnesota in 1972. He wrote for the leading fishing and outdoor magazines of the day and was the outdoor editor for The Baltimore Sun. He also wrote ten books about fly fishing, several of which are still considered leading authorities on the subject. He is listed by a leading online flyfishing publication, Fly Fishing Frenzy, as one of the 10 most influential fishermen ever. And the IGFA and others said he did more to popularize and expand fly fishing than any other individual.

== Biography ==
Brooks was born into a family that owned a successful insurance business. Joe worked in the business during his early life but soon realized he did not enjoy the business world and decided to become a professional fly fisherman and writer, the two passions he enjoyed most. He first began to write for small local Maryland sporting and community publications. But as his popularity gained, he started writing for national publications like Field and Stream, The Fisherman, True Fishing Annual, Fishing Waters of the World, Ashaway Sportsman, and Saltwater Sportsman. It was not long after this that he was hired by The Baltimore Sun as their outdoor editor. In 1953 he began writing for Outdoor Life, one of the most prestigious sporting magazines then and continuing today, and in 1968 he became the publication's fishing editor.

Joe Brooks was a mentor to and friend of one of the top fly fishermen ever to cast a line Lefty Kreh. Kreh credits Brooks for introducing him to fly fishing, encouraging him to start writing about the sport, and getting him one of his first jobs in the fishing industry. The job was with the Miami Herald running their Metropolitan Miami South Florida Fishing Tournament.

Joe Brooks pioneered fly fishing for species that previously were thought impossible to catch with a fly. He is also one of the first to pioneer “adventure fly fishing” by traveling to remote places around the world that had never been fly fished before.

In 1964, Curt Gowdy of ABC Sports produced a segment about fly fishing on ABC's Wide World of Sports featuring Joe Brooks. The two fly fished in the Argentinean Patagonia and the segment was so popular that a spinoff show was created to focus on outdoor sports such as hunting and fishing. The show was called The American_Sportsman and the first show aired on January 31, 1965. The show ran for over 20 years and was one of the most popular shows on Sunday afternoon television, often beating out other major sports programming carried in the same time slot. Joe Brooks was a regular on the show over the following years.

Joe Brooks taught many celebrities to fly fish and became lasting friends with them, including Bing Crosby, Ted Williams and Jack Nicklaus.

Joe Brooks died of a heart attack on September 20, 1972 in Rochester, Minnesota. He is buried in Paradise Valley near Livingston, Montana, one of his favorite places to fish.

== Bibliography ==
- Bass Bug Fishing (1947) A.S. Barnes & Company, New York
- Salt Water Fly Fishing (1950) Putnam, New York
- Greatest Fishing (1957) Stackpole Books, Mechanicsburg, PA
- Bermuda Fishing (1957) Stackpole Books, Mechanicsburg, PA
- Complete Book of Fly Fishing (1958) A.S. Barnes & Company, New York
- The Complete Illustrated Guide to Casting (1963) Doubleday, New York
- A World of Fishing (1964) D. Van Nostrand, New York
- Complete Guide to Fishing Across North America (1966) Joanna Cotler Books, New York
- Salt Water Game Fishing (1968) Harper & Row, New York
- Trout Fishing (1972) Harper & Row, New York
- Joe Brooks on Fly Fishing, Edited by Don Sedgewick with a foreword by Lefty Kreh, 2004, Lyons Press, Guilford, CT (Compilation of selected writings of Joe Brooks published posthumously by his wife Mary Brooks)
