= Humpy fly =

Fly fishing lure

- Artificial fly
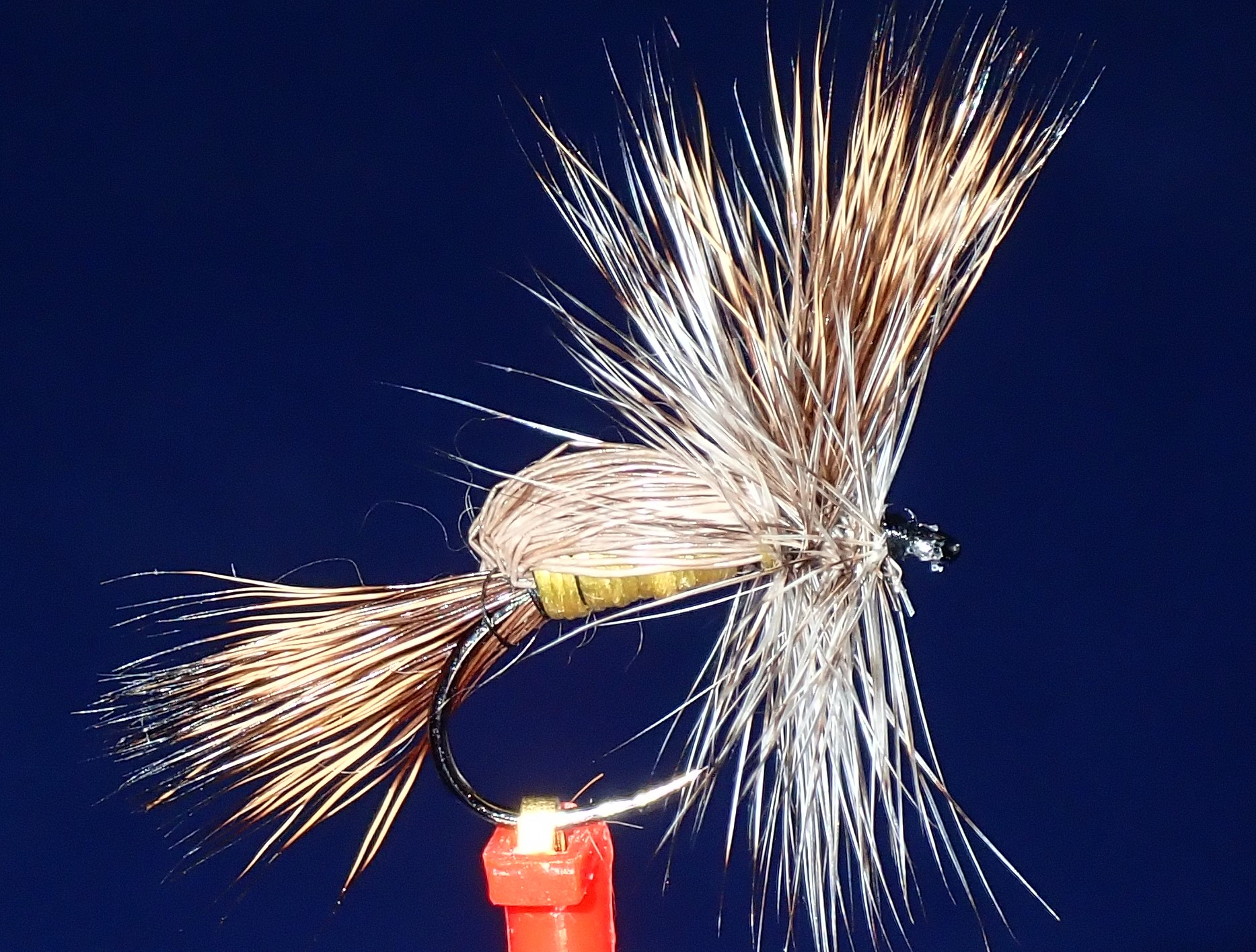
- Humpy fly
- Type: Dry fly
- Imitates: Mayflies, Stoneflies, Caddisflies, terrestrials

History
- Creator: Jack Horner
- Created: 1940s

Materials
- Typical sizes: 8-18 standard dry fly
- Typical hooks: TMC 100, Firehole 419
- Thread: 6/0, 8/0
- Tail: Deer, elk, moose hair
- Body: Deer, elk, moose hair over floss
- Wing: Deer, elk, foam, calf tail
- Hackle: Dry fly hackle

Uses
- Primary use: Trout

The Humpy fly is a popular and effective dry fly used by fly anglers for trout in fast-water conditions.

In The Professionals’ Favorite Flies (1993) Lefty Kreh praises the Humpy as:

The Humpy is one of the best flies ever invented for turbulent water where many dry flies are quickly drowned. It is not a specific imitation of an insect, but rather is a suggestive pattern that looks buggy, floats like a cork and has fooled thousands of trout. It is a fly that every serious western trout fisherman carries (and many eastern anglers are finding just as effective). I would never go trout fishing anywhere—Chile, Argentina, New Zealand, Europe—without a few Humpys in my box.

— Lefty Kreh

== Origin ==
The Humpy style originated with an early 19th century fly called the Tom Thumb which was being tied in both the Eastern U.S. and Canada as well as England as late as the 1940s. The Tom Thumb was a dry fly with two opposing clumps of deer hair over a colored thread body.

The Tom Thumb style was adapted in the late 1940s by California angler Jack Horner into a pattern he called the Horner Deer Hair fly, the first version of what is called the Humpy today. When the pattern was introduced to fly shop owners in Montana in the 1950s, the pattern became known as the Goofus Bug. Wyoming anglers started calling it the Humpy and the name stuck.

== Imitates ==
The Humpy is an attractor style dry fly that imitates no particular prey for trout. Its buggy appearance can resemble adult mayflies, caddisflies, stoneflies or terrestrial insects like grasshoppers.

== Materials ==
- Hook: Dry fly 8-14
- Thread: 6/0, 8/0
- Tail: Deer, elk or moose hair
- Underbody: Floss, thread, foam, hackle
- Body: Deer, elk or moose hair
- Wing: Deer or elf hair
- Hackle: Dry fly hackle

== Variations ==
As described in Trout Flies-The Tier's Reference (1999), Dave Hughes unless otherwise attributed

- Royal Humpy
- Adams Humpy
- Blond Humpy
- Green Humpy
Humpy Dry Flies
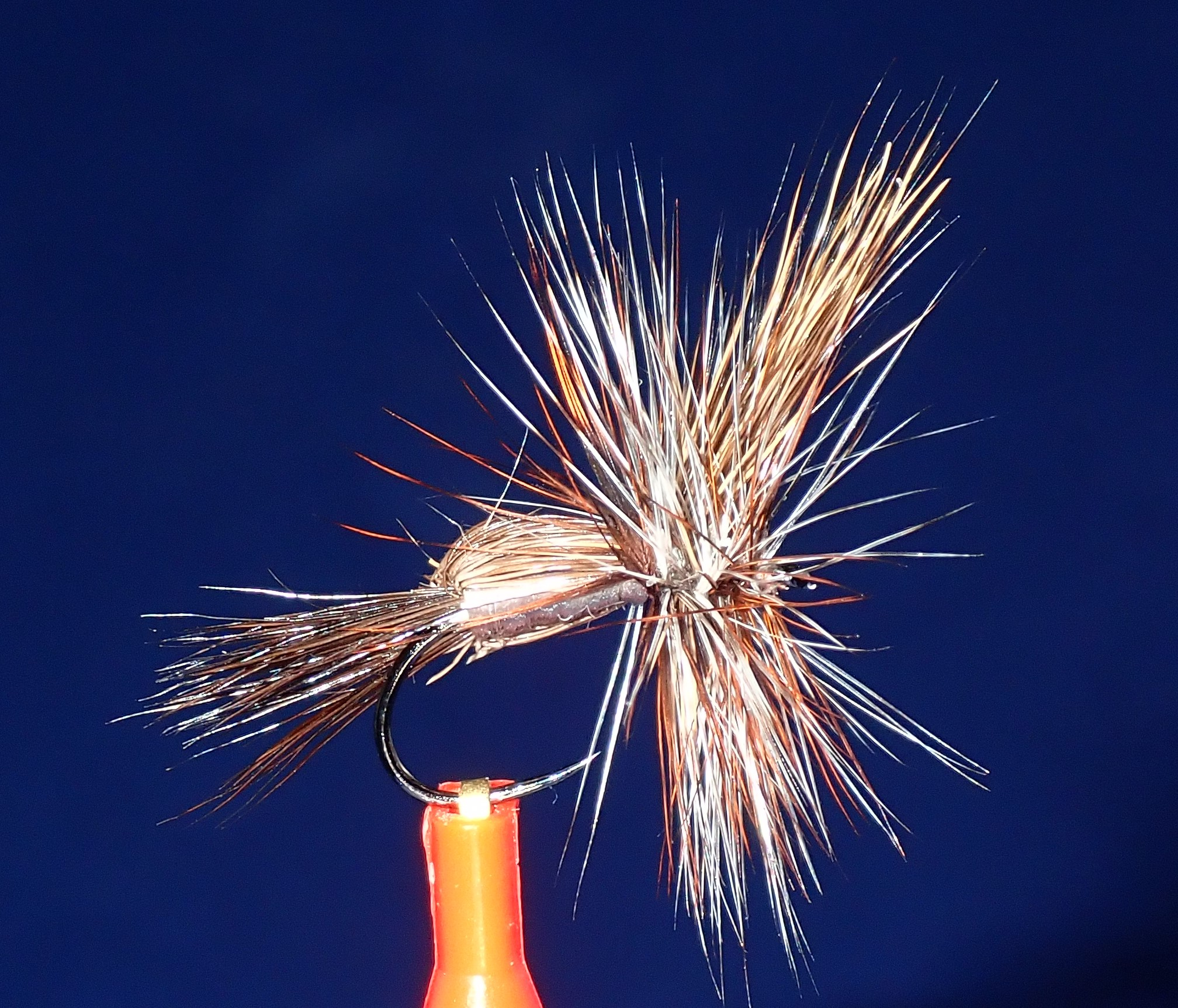
Adams Humpy

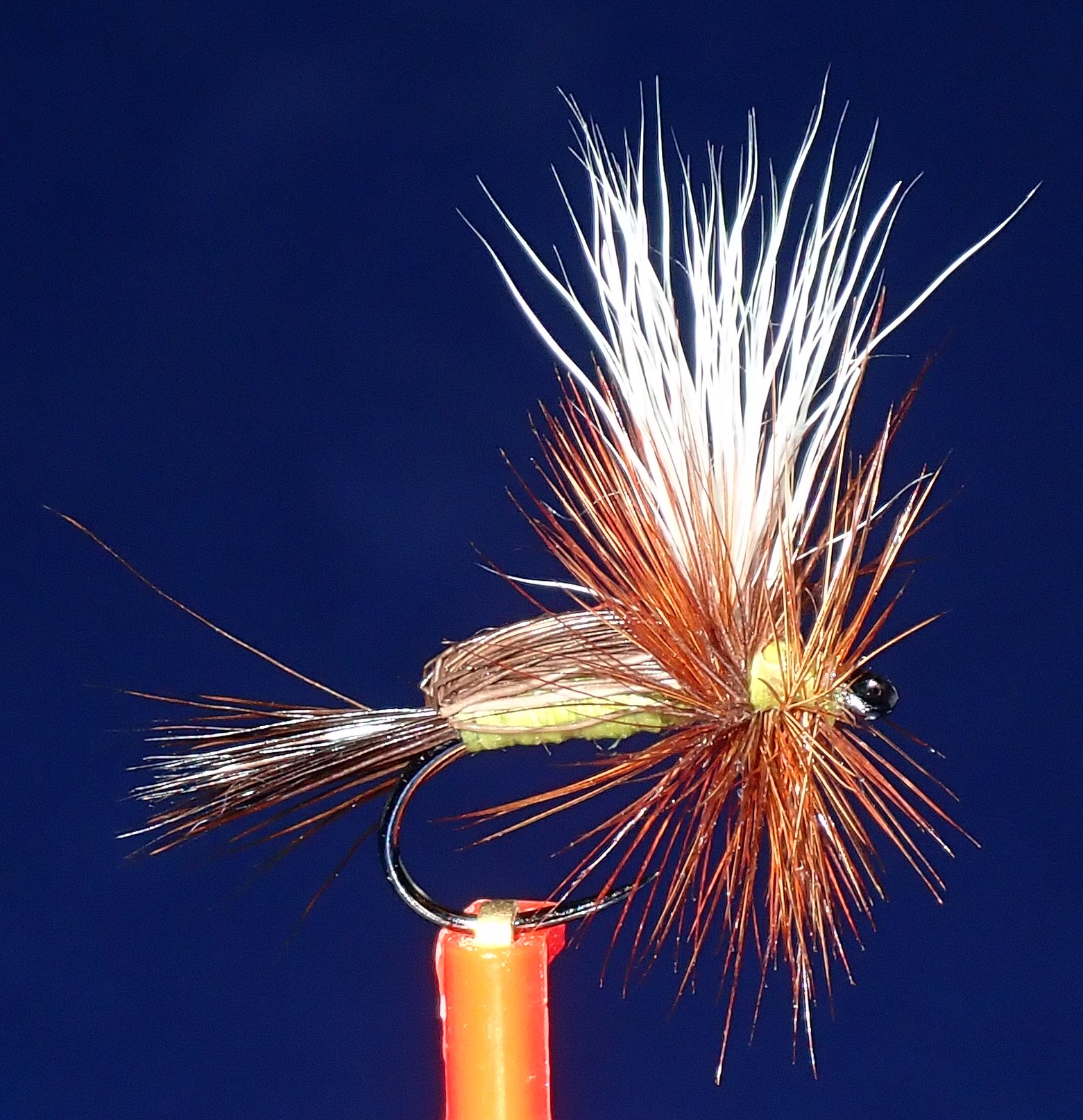
Green Humpy

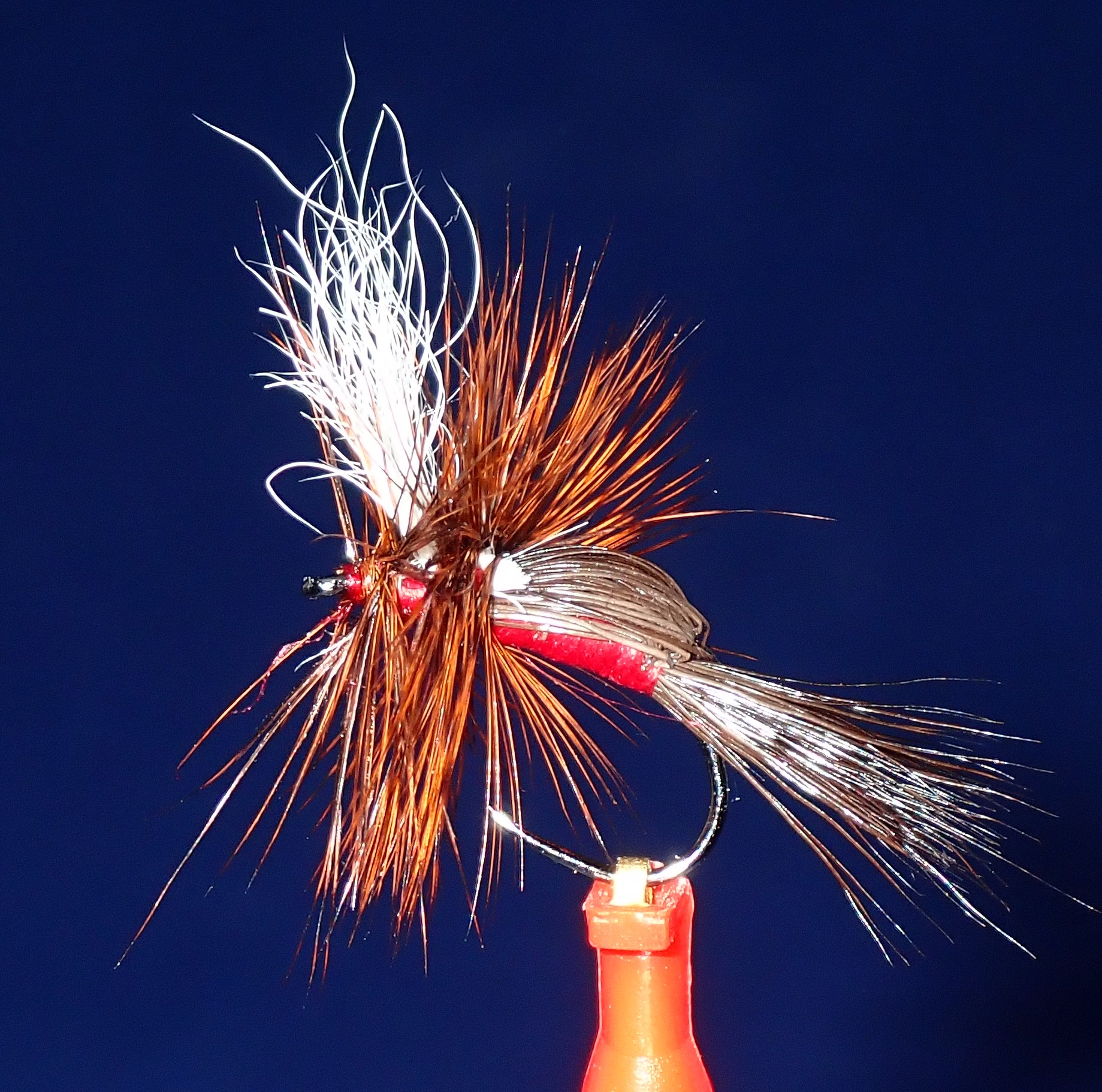
Royal Humpy
