= Sheila Link =

American sportswoman & writer

Sheila Jean Link (née King; July 25, 1923 – March 30, 2018) was an American sportswoman and firearm writer.

== Biography ==
Born on July 25, 1923, in Jersey City, New Jersey, Sheila was the daughter of Marian Hanlon and John McLeod King, an executive at the company that would become Aramco, and Marian, an executive assistant at McGraw-Hill. The family relocated to California during her early childhood, where Sheila developed a penchant for the outdoors, exploring local hills and learning to shoot with a BB gun and .22-caliber rifle.

She attended Straubenmuller Textile High School in Manhattan and later majored in music at the College of San Mateo in California. Although she did not graduate, Sheila played with the San Francisco Civic Symphony and was a lifelong member of the musicians' union. She married high school acquaintance Frederic Link, with whom she performed in local jazz clubs—Frederic on drums and Sheila on bass.

Despite a deep-rooted love for music, Sheila's lifelong interest in the outdoors and firearms, fostered during her California youth, took precedence. She engaged in various related activities, including hunting with her son, contributing to outdoor magazines such as Outdoor Life, Field & Stream, and Sports Afield, and producing a nine-year radio program, Call of the Outdoors.

In the 1970s, Sheila's expertise led her to be featured on ABC's The American Sportsman and enlisted by the National Rifle Association of America as a spokeswoman and, aimed at recruiting women into the organization and promoting firearms safety and outdoor skills. She authored two books: The Hardy Boys Handbook: Seven Stories of Survival (1980) and Women's Guide to Outdoor Sports (1984).

Sheila was the first woman elected to the Outdoor Writers Association of America and served as its president. Although an NRA life member from 1973, her views on the organization nuanced over time.

== Bibliography ==
- The Hardy Boys Handbook: Seven Stories of Survival (1980)
- Women's Guide to Outdoor Sports (1984)
