= Grits Gresham =

American television personality

- Born: Claude Hamilton Gresham Jr. June 21, 1922; Spartanburg County, South Carolina, US
- Died: February 18, 2008 (aged 85); Natchitoches, Louisiana, US
- Occupations: Sportsman, journalist, host of ABC's The American Sportsman (1966–1979)
- Spouse: Mary Eleanor Gresham (married 1944-2001, her death)
- Children: Three, including Tom Gresham

Claude Hamilton Gresham Jr. (June 21, 1922 – February 18, 2008), better known as Grits Gresham, was an American sportsman, author, photographer and television personality who hosted ABC's The American Sportsman television series from 1966 to 1979. Gresham, who resided on the historic Cane River Lake in Natchitoches, the oldest city in Louisiana, traveled throughout the globe, particularly South America and Africa, to engage in hunting, fishing, and shooting with various American celebrities. He was a champion of the environment and conservation, the subject of his graduate school thesis.

== Early years, education, military ==
Gresham was born in Spartanburg County, South Carolina, to Claude Gresham Sr. and the former Belle Hill.

He attended on a baseball scholarship the Blue Ridge School for Boys, a private male boarding school named for the Blue Ridge Mountains and located in Hendersonville, North Carolina. This school closed its doors in 1968. He also studied at the University of North Carolina at Chapel Hill, Vanderbilt University in Nashville, and Yale University in New Haven, Connecticut, but he procured his Bachelor of Science and Master of Science degrees, with specialty in forestry and wildlife management, from Louisiana State University in Baton Rouge, where he was thereafter an inductee into the LSU Hall of Distinction.

Before Gresham began his career in outdoor journalism, he was on the roster of the Cubs' Shelby, North Carolina farm team but never played. His son, Tom Gresham, learned of the baseball offer from the Cubs several years after his father's death while looking through old family records. "He went to work to take care of his young family ... I wonder how much it hurt him to make that decision. So much that he never, ever told us he was signed by the Cubs."

During World War II, Gresham served in the United States Army Air Corps, the precursor to the United States Air Force. He considered his military service as important as his success in journalism.

In 1944, Gresham married the former Mary Eleanor Ryan (July 4, 1925 – March 5, 2001). She was a Roman Catholic, and he was a Baptist; they wed in a Methodist Church in Nashville, Tennessee while he was in between military assignments. In their first thirteen years of marriage, they had a different address each Christmas. Mary became an excellent cook by necessity and assisted her husband on his assignments with the use of her memory, note-taking, and photographic skills.

The Greshams had three children, including Thomas Hamilton "Tom" Gresham, host of weekly radio program Gun Talk.

== Outdoors journalist and commentator ==
Gresham worked for the United States Fish and Wildlife Service and thereafter edited the Louisiana Conservationist magazine. He was the former outdoors editor of The Shreveport Times too.

Gresham succeeded former Governor of South Dakota Joe Foss as the host of The American Sportsman. He was thereafter joined by Curt Gowdy as co-host. Gresham further hosted Shooting Sports America, sponsored by Chevy Trucks on the ESPN network. For twenty-six years, he was the shooting editor of Sports Afield magazine. He was also published in Sports Illustrated and Gentleman's Quarterly. He appeared in television commercials for Miller Lite Beer.

== The interview with Reagan ==
In an interview with U.S. President Ronald Reagan, Gresham reported that Reagan, as a fledgling radio announcer, had once used a Colt pistol to save a nurse in Des Moines, Iowa from a mugging on a street. The nurse later confirmed the story but had not known that it was Reagan who had saved her.

== Fishing and the wetlands ==
Gresham was among the first to sound the alarm about the loss of wetlands in Louisiana. He worked with Ray Scott, the founder of the Bass Anglers Sportsman Society, to halt the cheating that had previously haunted tournament bass fishing. Gresham's Kiss the Land Goodbye was one of the early works about vanishing wetlands.

Gresham's The Complete Book of Bass Fishing is, according to Ray Scott, "the best book ever written on bass fishing." Gresham wrote a column for Scott's Bassmaster magazine pro bono.

== Death and legacy ==
Gresham died at his home on Cane River Lake in Natchitoches, a small city in north central Louisiana, of complications from Alzheimer's disease – pneumonia and infection. He had spent most of his last year in a nursing home in Natchitoches. In addition to his children, he was survived by three sisters, Rosa Schemmel of Wichita, Kansas, and Edith Kelley and Ruth Bedingfield of Ware Shoals in northwestern South Carolina. Gresham's son Tom Gresham is a noted radio and podcast personality and a 2nd Amendment advocate. Among Gresham's pallbearers was State Representative Rick Nowlin of Natchitoches.

Gary Garth, the outdoor editor of The Courier-Journal in Louisville, Kentucky, relates that he became "addicted" to duck hunting as a child, based on the encouragement of Grits Gresham columns. "Through my work I've had the opportunity to meet, hunt, and fish with a few of the giants in my business. But I never met Grits. It's just as well. Some pedestals should remain untouched," Garth said in his tribute to the legendary outdoorsman.

Joe Macaluso, outdoor editor of the Baton Rouge Morning Advocate recalled a fishing trip with Gresham on Toledo Bend Reservoir at the Texas-Louisiana boundary. Macaluso described Gresham as "the most famous of all Louisiana outdoors writers and media members... He was like a loaf of good French bread, crusty-hard on the outside and tender on the inside. When I told him that, he laughed [and said] 'Don’t tell anyone else'..."

The Gresham Collection is located at the Louisiana Sports Hall of Fame Foundation in Natchitoches.

== Books ==
- The Complete Book of Bass Fishing
- Fishes and Fishing In Louisiana
- Fishing and Boating in Louisiana
- The Sportsman and his Family Outdoors
- The Complete Wildfowler
- Grits on Guns
- Grits Gresham on Duck Hunting (video)
- Grits Gresham on Goose Hunting (video)
- Weatherby: The Man. the Gun. the Legend
