= Lefty's Deceiver =

Fishing fly

- Artificial fly
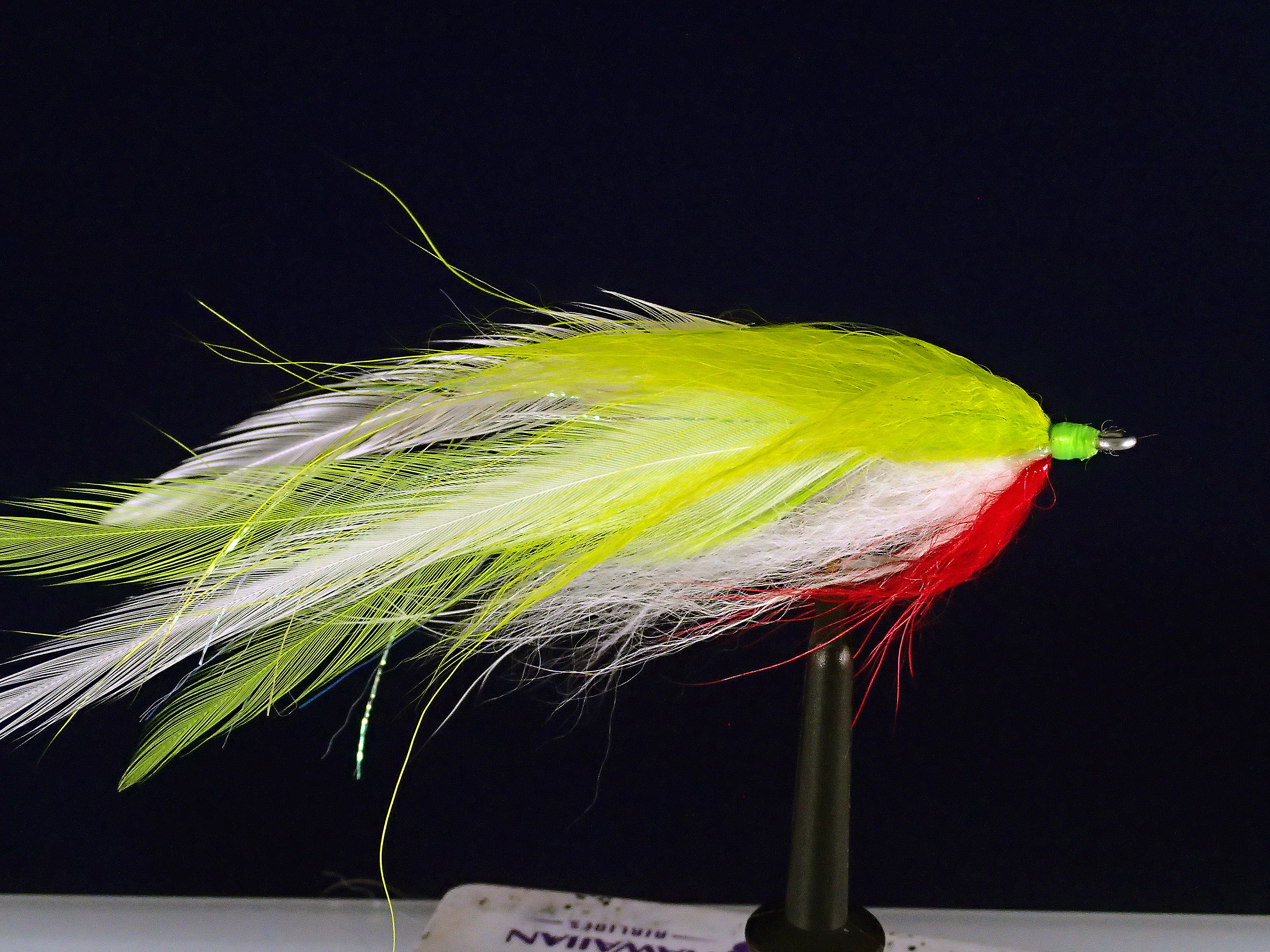
- White and Chartreuse Fur Deceiver
- Type: Streamer

History
- Creator: Lefty Kreh
- Created: 1950s

Materials
- Typical sizes: 8-2/0
- Typical hooks: TMC 811S stainless saltwater or equivalent
- Thread: White 3/0, 6/0 or equivalent
- Tail: Four to six white saddle hackles
- Body: Silver tinsel
- Wing: White bucktail
- Topping: Silver krystal flash
- Head: White thread

Uses
- Primary use: All species of saltwater and fresh water gamefish

Reference(s)
- Pattern references: Whitelaw, Ian (2015). The History of Fly-Fishing in Fifty Flies. New York: Abrams. pp. 140–143. ISBN 9781617691461.

The Lefty's Deceiver is an artificial fly streamer pattern used in fly fishing for freshwater and saltwater species. The fly was originated by fly angler and author Lefty Kreh in the Chesapeake Bay for striped bass. The original fly was tied to resemble smelt, a common striped bass forage. The Deceiver is arguably the best known saltwater fly pattern in the world and in 1991 the U.S. Postal Service honored Kreh’s creation with a postage stamp.

== Origin ==
In the late 1950s, striped bass populations in the Chesapeake Bay were healthy and Lefty Kreh pursued them on a regular basis along the lower Eastern shore of the bay. He and his fishing partners faced a rather common issue with the big streamer flies of the time—feathers fouling around the hook. Saddle hackles secured near the eye of the hook, as was the common practice of the time, had a tendency to twist and foul around the hook bend during retrieves. Fouled flies rarely deceived the wily striped bass. Lefty’s goal as he put it was: "I'm going to design a fly that won't foul on the cast! It will have a fish shape, but can be made in many lengths. You can vary the color combinations; it will also swim well but when lifted for the back cast it will be sleek and have little air-resistance." The original Deceiver was all white and mimicked the prolific smelt that the Chesapeake Bay stripers foraged on.

== Materials ==
The original Lefty's Deceiver was tied with white saddle hackles tied in at the bend of a standard, short shank saltwater hook. Four to six hackles were used with tips curved to the outside. Flash was added on top of the hackles. The original body was silver tinsel. A collar of white buck tail was layered at the top, sides and bottom of the front of the hook. The buck tail extended just beyond the hook bend.

== Variations and sizes ==
In the 1960s when Lefty Kreh relocated to South Florida and began pushing the limits of saltwater fly fishing, the Deceiver grew in popularity and in variety. Today, the Deceiver is tied in an almost infinite number of color-material-size combinations. In 2012, Kreh published 101 Fish—A Fly Fisher’s Life List detailing many of his fly fishing exploits around the world. A great majority of those species were caught on variations of the Lefty’s Deceiver. Fly tiers have recreated the pattern in a wide variety of colors and configurations to mimick the various fresh and saltwater forage fish that larger fish feed upon.

== Gallery ==
Lefty's Deceiver gallery
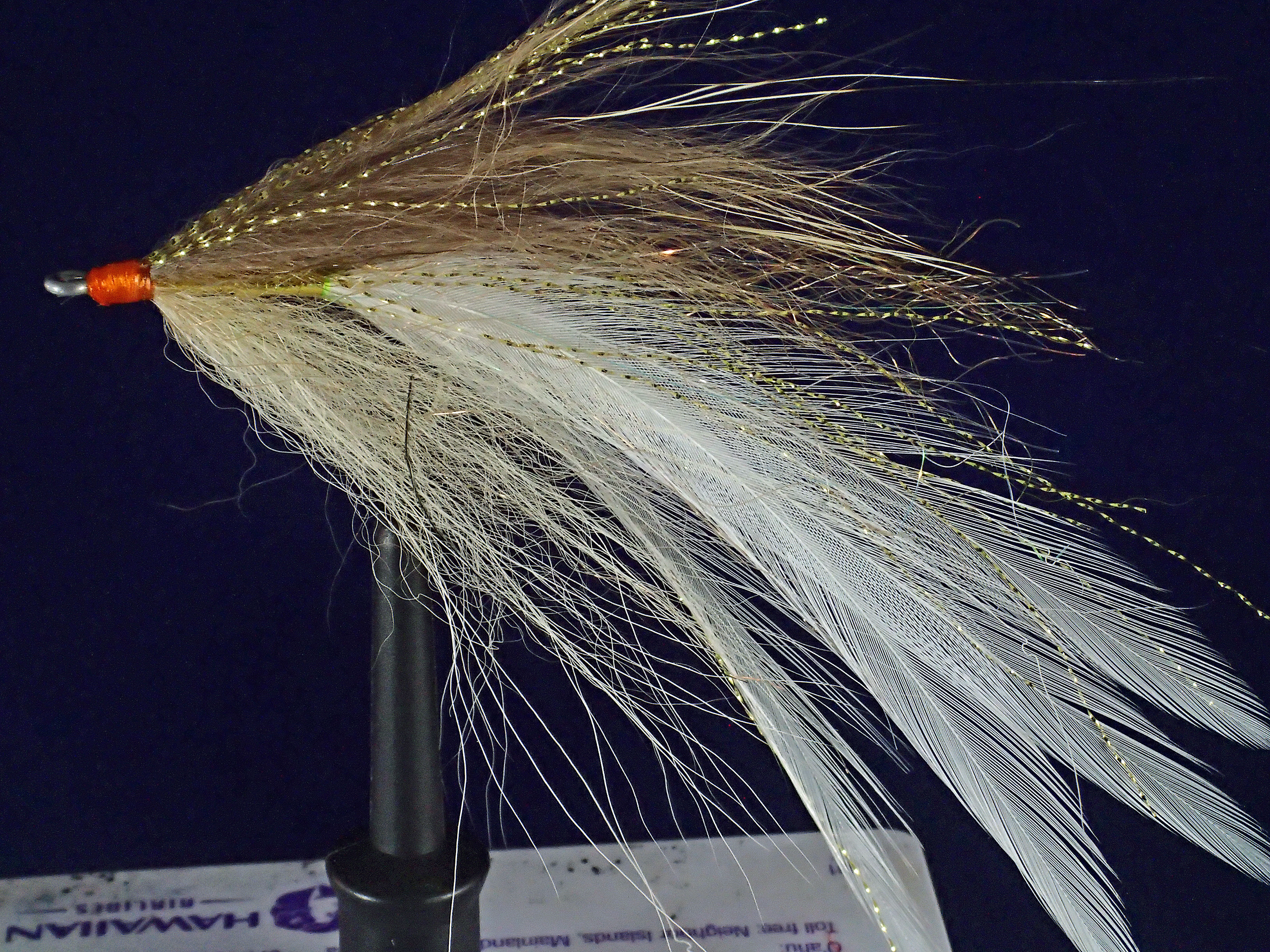
Brown and white fur Deceiver

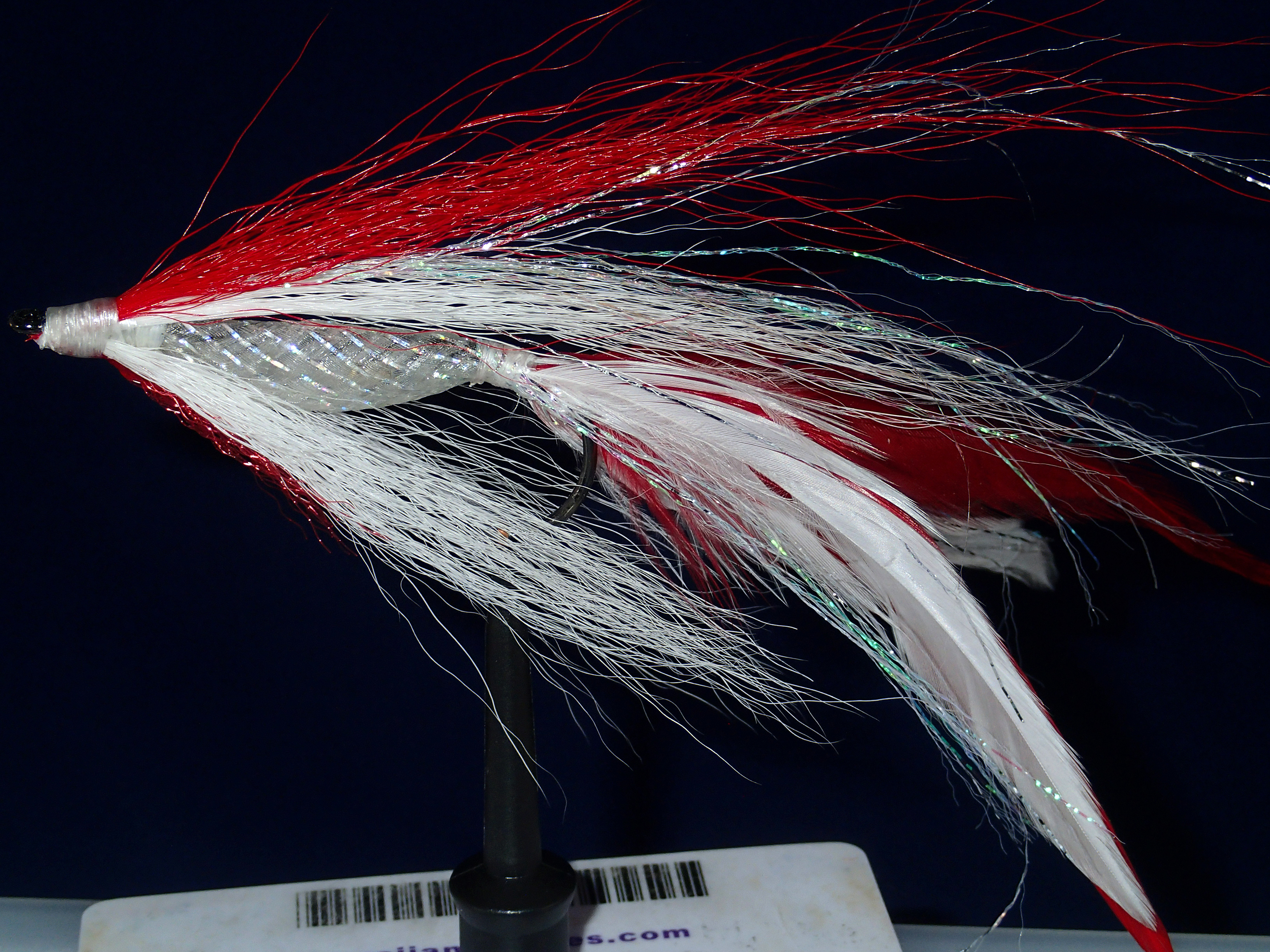
Red and white rattle body Deceiver

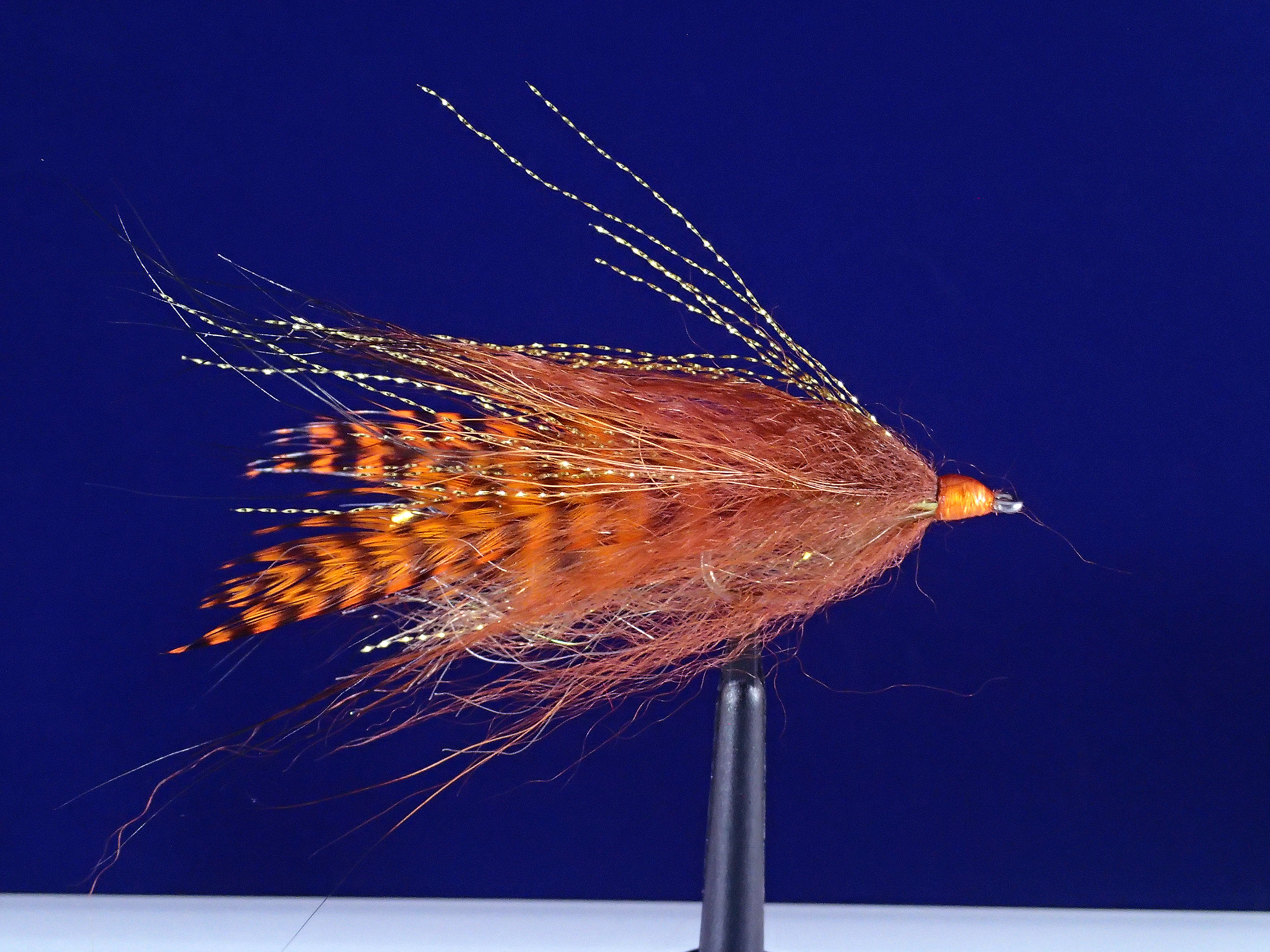
Cockroach Deceiver

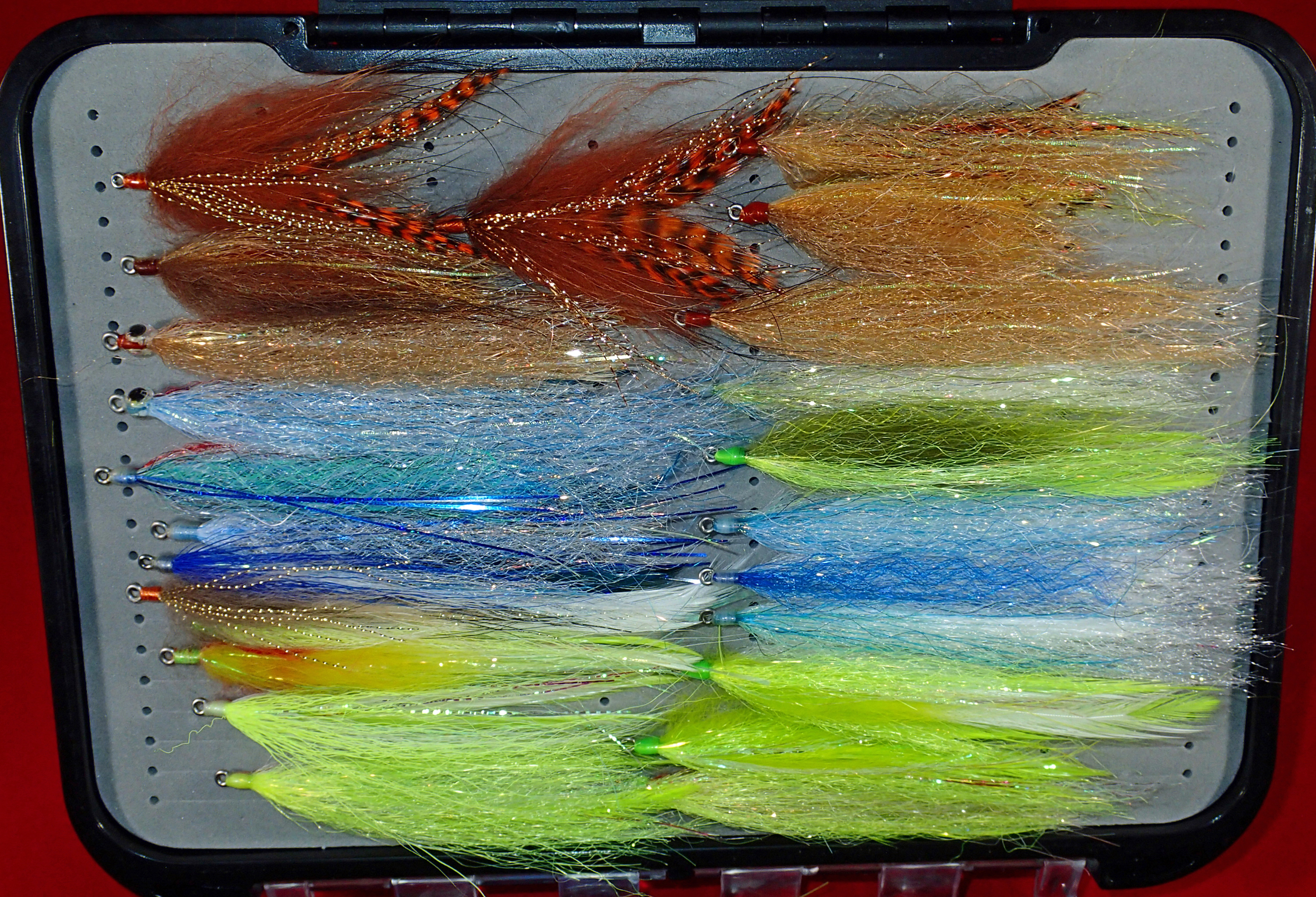
Saltwater Lefty's Deceivers

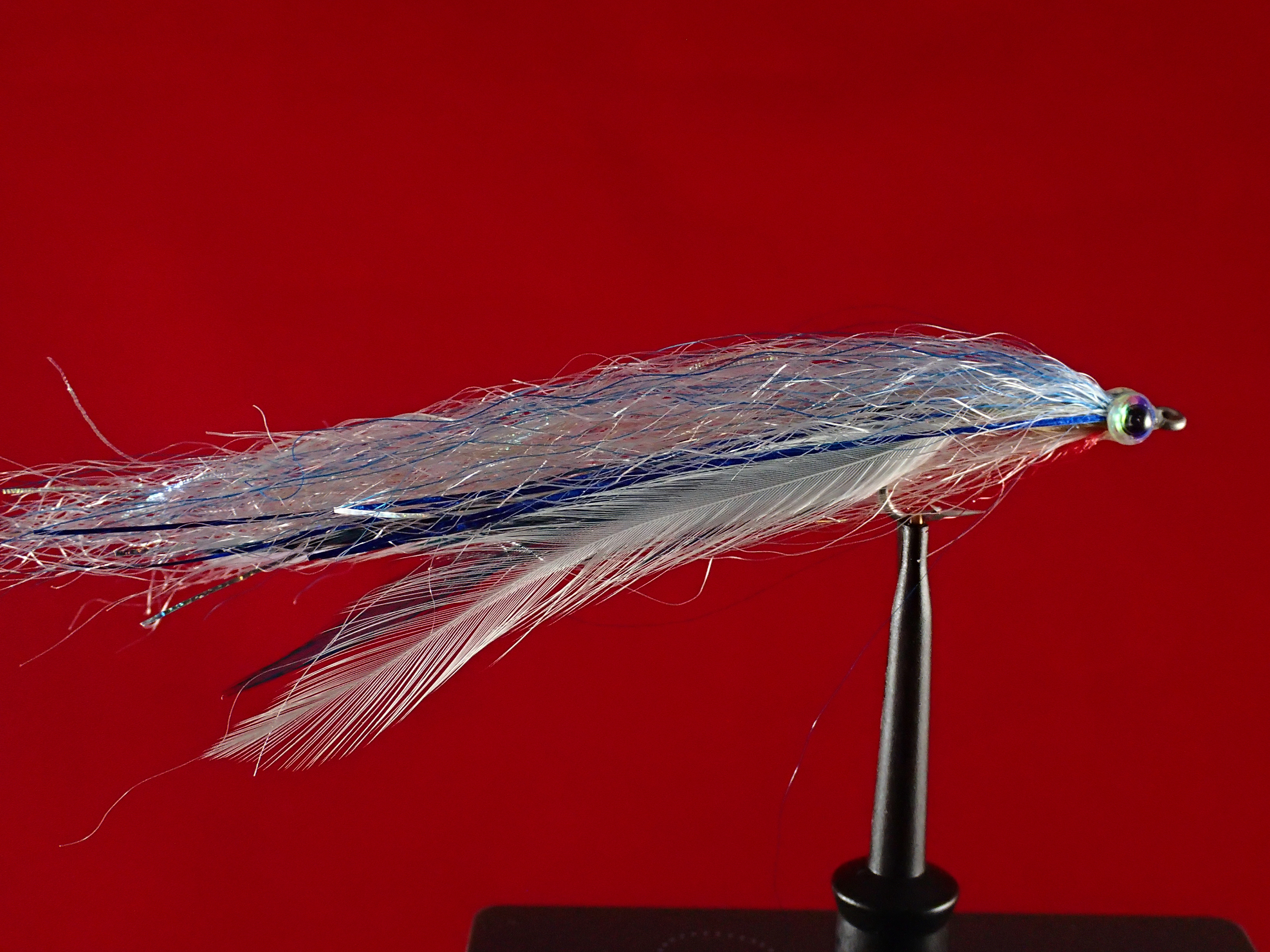
Blue and white Deceiver
