= Joe Brooks (coach) =

American sports coach, athletics administrator (1922–1990)

Biographical details
- Born: June 2, 1922; Madison, Maine, U.S.
- Died: December 3, 1990 (aged 68); Jacksonville, Illinois, U.S.

Coaching career (HC unless noted)

Football
- 1946: Jacksonville HS (IL) (assistant)
- 1947–1952: Illinois College (assistant)
- 1955: Illinois College (assistant)
- 1956–1985: Illinois College

Basketball
- 1956–1958: Illinois College

Baseball
- 1948–1986: Illinois College

Administrative career (AD unless noted)
- 1956–1986: Illinois College

Head coaching record
- Overall: 112–127–9 (football); 16–29 (basketball); 196–427–6 (basketball)

Accomplishments and honors

Championships
- Football; 3 Prairie College Conference (1959, 1961, 1965)

Everett Joseph Brooks (June 2, 1922 – December 3, 1990) was an American football, basketball, and baseball coach, athletics administrator, and educator. He served as the head football coach at Illinois College in Jacksonville, Illinois from 1956 to 1985, compiling a record of 112–127–9. Brooks was also the head baseball coach at Illinois College from 1948 to 1986, amassing a record for 196–427–6, and the school's head basketball coach for two seasons, from 1956 to 1958, tallying a mark of 16–29.

Brooks was born on June 2, 1922, in Madison, Maine, to William A. and Irene (Withee) Brooks. He attended Wilton Academy in Maine before studying at the University of Illinois from 1940 to 1943. The college career was interrupt by military during World War II, when he fought with the United States Army in North Africa, Siciy, and Italy. Brooks returned to Illinois after the war, earning a Bachelor of Science degree in 1946 and a Master of Science degree in physical education in 1950. From 1946 to 1947, Brooks was an assistant coach and economics and history teacher at Jacksonville High School in Jacksonville, Illinois. He was hired at Illinois College in 1947 as an assistant coach and physical education instructor. After a hiatus from 1953 to 1955, Brooks returned to Illinois College. The following year, he succeeded Al Miller as head football coach and athletic director. He remained in that position until retiring in 1986.

Brooks died on December 3, 1990, at his home in Jacksonville.

== Head coaching record ==
=== Football ===
| Year | Team | Overall | Conference | Standing | Bowl/playoffs |
|---|---|---|---|---|---|
Illinois College Blueboys (Prairie College Conference) (1956–1967)
| 1956 | Illinois College | 2–5 | | | |
| 1957 | Illinois College | 3–4 | | | |
| 1958 | Illinois College | 3–5 | | | |
| 1959 | Illinois College | 3–2–2 | 1–0–1 | T–1st | |
| 1960 | Illinois College | 5–3 | 1–1 | 2nd | |
| 1961 | Illinois College | 2–4–2 | 1–0–1 | T–1st | |
| 1962 | Illinois College | 6–2 | | | |
| 1963 | Illinois College | 5–3 | 1–1 | 2nd | |
| 1964 | Illinois College | 4–4 | 0–2 | 3rd | |
| 1965 | Illinois College | 6–2 | 1–1 | T–1st | |
| 1966 | Illinois College | 4–4 | 0–2 | 3rd | |
| 1967 | Illinois College | 1–6–1 | 0–1–1 | T–2nd | |
Illinois College Blueboys (NCAA College Division / NCAA Division II independent) (1968–1977)
| 1968 | Illinois College | 2–4–2 | | | |
| 1969 | Illinois College | 5–2–1 | | | |
| 1970 | Illinois College | 3–5 | | | |
| 1971 | Illinois College | 5–3 | | | |
| 1972 | Illinois College | 1–8 | | | |
| 1973 | Illinois College | 2–7 | | | |
| 1974 | Illinois College | 4–4 | | | |
| 1975 | Illinois College | 3–6 | | | |
| 1976 | Illinois College | 4–4–1 | | | |
| 1977 | Illinois College | 7–1 | | | |
Illinois College Blueboys (NCAA Division III independent) (1978–1982)
| 1978 | Illinois College | 8–1 | | | |
| 1979 | Illinois College | 6–2 | | | |
| 1980 | Illinois College | 8–1 | | | |
| 1981 | Illinois College | 7–2 | | | |
| 1982 | Illinois College | 3–6 | | | |
Illinois College Blueboys (Midwest Conference) (1983–1985)
| 1983 | Illinois College | 3–6 | 2–3 | 3rd (South) | |
| 1984 | Illinois College | 1–8 | 1–6 | 6th (South) | |
| 1985 | Illinois College | 1–8 | 1–6 | 6th (South) | |
| Illinois College: | | 112–127–9 | | | |
| Total: | | 112–127–9 | | | |
National championship Conference title Conference division title or championship game berth
