= Lefty Kreh =

American fly fisherman, photographer and fly casting instructor

- Born: Bernard Victor Kreh; February 26, 1925; Frederick, Maryland
- Died: March 14, 2018 (aged 93); Cockeysville, Maryland
- Occupations: Fly angler, photographer and fly casting instructor
- Notable work: Fly Fishing in Saltwater (1974)

Bernard "Lefty" Kreh (February 26, 1925 – March 14, 2018) was an American fly fisherman, photographer and fly casting instructor who resided most recently in Hunt Valley, Maryland. Kreh is most known for being one of the pioneers of saltwater fly fishing and his book, Fly Fishing in Salt Water, is considered the seminal volume on the subject.

His wife, Evelyn Kreh, died in November 2011. They had two children.

== Early years ==
Kreh was born February 26, 1925, in Frederick, Maryland, where he attended Frederick High School. His parents were Theodore (aka "Whitey"), who died in a basketball accident when Kreh was eight; and Helen M. Purdy. His father taught him about fishing, and after he died Lefty would bring fish home for his mother and three siblings, Eileen, Dick and Teddy.

Lefty served in the Battle of The Bulge. He said they barely ate, and always were cold. He was one of the men who helped to take the Ludendorff Bridge from the Germans in the Battle of Remagen. That battle and victory was a turning point in the European theatre for WW2. After serving in World War II, Kreh was one of three US servicemen infected with anthrax, and the only one to survive. The strain he was infected with was named BVK-I as a result.

He began fly-fishing in 1947 while serving as a guide for the famous fly fisherman Joe Brooks. In 1965 he moved to Miami, Florida, and became the Director of the Metropolitan Fishing Tournament. He wrote for various fishing magazines. He is known throughout to always throw his fish back, keeping the flow in the waters for more fish. He began to fish for saltwater species in the Florida Keys. It was during this time that Kreh, Joe Brooks, Al Pflueger, Tom McNally, George Hommel, Stu Apte and Bob Stearn's pioneered the techniques, deviating from the classic "Ten to Two" casting technique, that modern saltwater anglers use to pursue fish with fly fishing gear.

== Career ==
In addition to his fishing accomplishments, Kreh had been an active outdoor writer for more than forty-five years. He wrote for most major outdoor magazines. He was the retired outdoor editor of The Baltimore Sun and held a staff position on several outdoor magazines. Kreh was also an accomplished photographer. On top of all of this, he was part of the TFO rod company and played a key role in the creation of several rods, including the Lefty Kreh series and BVK series (named after the strain of anthrax he survived, BVK-1).

== Creation of Lefty's Deceiver ==
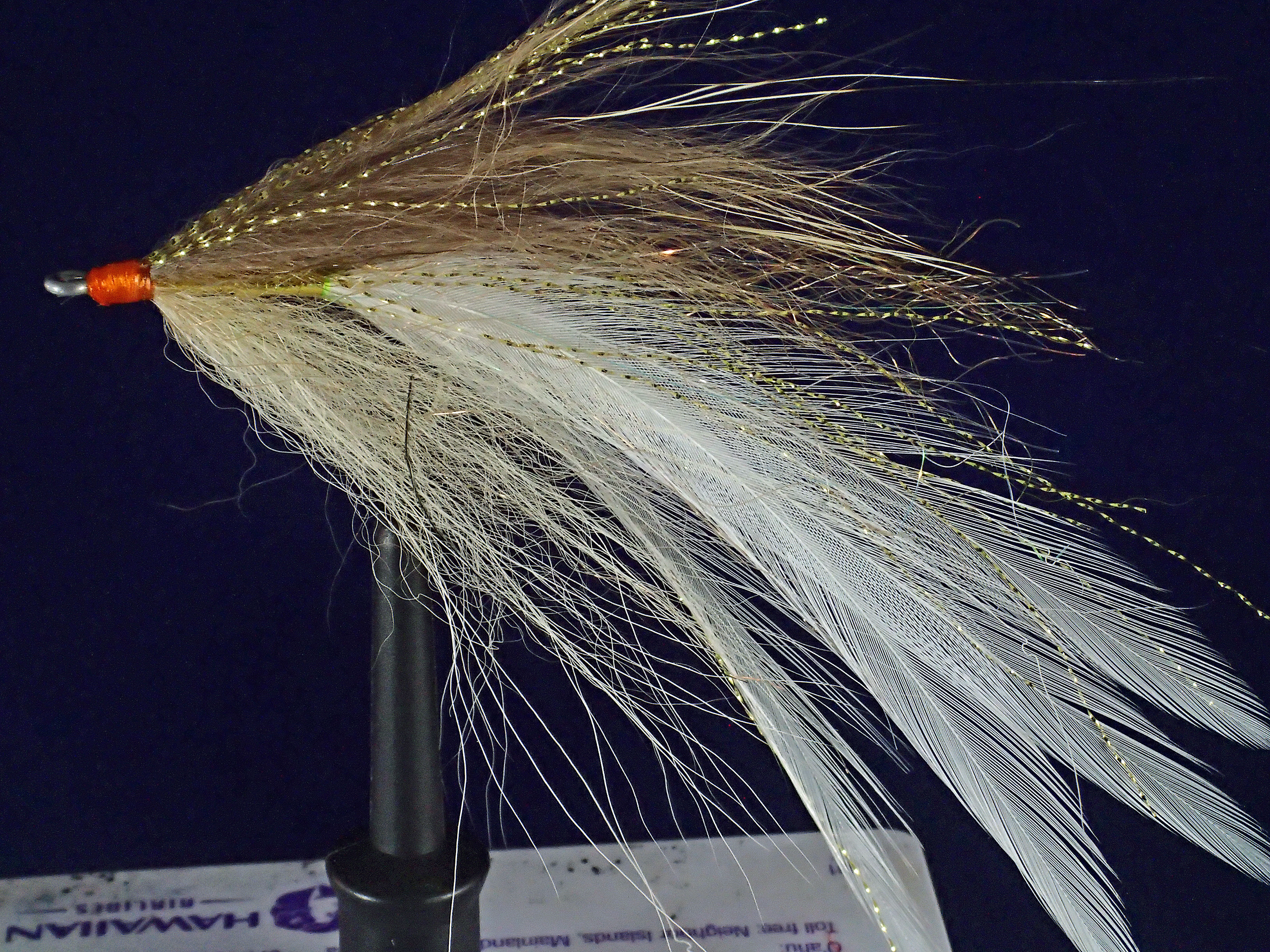
Brown and white fur Deceiver

Lefty's Deceiver is an artificial fly commonly categorized as a streamer fly which is fished under the water's surface. It is a popular and widely used pattern for both predacious freshwater and saltwater game fish. It is generally considered one of the top patterns to have in any fly box. Kreh invented the Deceiver fly in the late 1950s as a streamer that would be easy to cast in wind and would not "foul" (or wrap around the bend of the hook) a common problem for older streamer patterns. The original Lefty's Deceiver was tied in as a white pattern, but fly tiers have recreated the pattern in a variety of colors. A darker colored top with a lighter bottom (mimicking the various forage fishes that larger fishes feed upon) is the most popular design. The Deceiver is arguably the best-known saltwater fly pattern in the world, and in 1991 the U.S. Postal Service honored Kreh’s creation with a postage stamp.

== Instruction ==
In 2010, the first "Lefty Kreh Flyfishing Challenge Course" was created as the centerpiece of instruction at HomeWaters University, which is located in Spruce Creek, Pennsylvania. Kreh designed the course himself, incorporating dry land, still water and moving water into various casting stations. He called it a "challenge" course, as opposed to a "casting" course, because he included real-world fly-fishing conditions. Scenarios include the need for long casts, short and precise presentations, casting into the wind, casting with no room for a back cast, and dealing with boulders, rapidly moving water, logs, and other floating debris. A historical journey of Lefty's instruction can be found in the Loop Publication (April–July 2017) which is published by Fly Fishers International. The piece is a reflection in Lefty's words about his life teaching and instructing fly casting with an interview by Mac Brown.

== Awards and honors ==
Kreh received the prestigious "Lifetime Achievement Award" by the American Sportfishing Association, has been honored with the "Lifetime Contribution Award" by the North American Fly Tackle Trade Association, and is also in the Freshwater Fishing Hall of Fame. In 1997 he was named "Angler of the Year" by Fly Rod and Reel Magazine. In 2003 Kreh was inducted to the International Game Fish Association Hall of Fame. Kreh has served a number of years as Senior Advisor to Trout Unlimited, the Federation of Fly Fishers. Lefty was inducted with Mac Brown in the category of recreation into the Fly Fishing Museum of Southern Appalachia Hall of Fame in 2018.

== Media appearances ==
Video Games: The iPad games Chuckin' Bugs 101 and Olive the Woolly Bugger pay homage to Kreh. One of the main characters, "Lefty Crayfish", is an anthropomorphized crayfish named after the famous fisherman. Beginning in 2010, Lefty co-hosted the Outdoor Channel fishing show Buccaneers & Bones, along with host/narrator and retired news anchor Tom Brokaw, several other outdoor professionals, and entertainment personalities. The show is shot on location on the coast of Belize and the Bahamas and features the cast teaming up with local guides. The focus of the show is to draw attention to the efforts of The Bonefish and Tarpon Trust, a conservation and research organization dedicated to the preservation of the two warm climate saltwater gamefish species.

== Legacy ==
Much of Lefty Kreh's personal collection of angling memorabilia, tackle, literature, and original fly patterns are held by the American Museum of Fly Fishing in Manchester, Vermont. A fishing access trail along the Gunpowder Falls in Baltimore County, Maryland is named after Kreh. The waterway, which has undergone extensive habitat restoration to become a premier cold water trout fishery, is only a few miles from Kreh's home.

== Death ==
Kreh died of congestive heart failure at his home in Cockeysville, Maryland, March 14, 2018.

== Bibliography ==
- Kreh, Lefty (1972). Tips & Tricks of Fly Fishing (Garcia Sports Library). Paterson, NJ: Athletic Activities Publishing Co.
- Kreh, Lefty (1974). Fly Fishing in Saltwater. New York: Crown Publishers Inc.
- Kreh, Lefty (1974). Fly casting with Lefty Kreh. Lippincott. ISBN 9780397009992.
- Kreh, Lefty; Sosin, Mark (1987). Fishing the Flats. Lyons Press.
- Kreh, Lefty (1988). L.L. Bean Guide to Outdoor Photography. Random House. ISBN 9780394550350.
- Kreh, Lefty; Sosin, Mark (1988). Practical Fishing Knots. Crown Publishers, Inc. ISBN 9780517521342.
- Kreh, Lefty (1991). Longer Fly Casting. Lyons Press. ISBN 9781558211278.
- Kreh, Lefty (1991). American Masters Fly Fishing Symposium Part 2 - Tackle - Lefty's Little Library of Fly Fishing. Odysseus Editions.
- Kreh, Lefty; Middleton, Harry (1991). Lefty's Favorite Fly Fishing Waters Vol. 1 -- United States. Odysseus Editions.
- Kreh, Lefty (1991). Fly Fishing Knots and Connections (Lefty's Little Library of Fly Fishing). Odysseus Editions.
- Kreh, Lefty (1991). Lefty Kreh's Modern Fly Casting Method: Mastering the Essential Casts (Lefty's Little Library of Fly Fishing). Odysseus Editions.
- Kreh, Lefty (1991). Lefty Little Tips (Lefty's Little Library of Fly Fishing). Odysseus Editions.
- Kreh, Lefty (1991). A general survey of fly fishing techniques & tactics in fresh and saltwater (Lefty's little library of fly fishing). Odysseus Editions.
- Kreh, Lefty (1994). Advanced Fly Fishing Techniques: Secrets of an Avid Fisherman. Delta Press. ISBN 9780385308359.
- Kreh, Lefty (1994). Saltwater Fly Patterns. Lyons Press. ISBN 9781558213364.
- Oglesby, Arthur; Kreh, Lefty; Ulnitz, Steen (1998). The Complete Book of Flyfishing. Stoeger Publishing Company. ISBN 9780883172087.
- Kreh, Lefty (1999). Presenting The Fly: A Practical Guide to the Most Important Element of Fly Fishing. Lyons Press. ISBN 9781558217881.
- Kreh, Lefty (2000). 101 Fly-Fishing Tips: Practical Advice From a Master Angler. Lyons Press. ISBN 9781585740352.
- Kreh, Lefty (2000). Solving Fly-Casting Problems. Lyons Press. ISBN 9781585740345.
- Kreh, Lefty (2001). L.L. Bean Saltwater Fly-Fishing Handbook. Lyons Press. ISBN 9781585741519.
- Kreh, Lefty (2002). Fly Fishing the Inshore Waters: How to Catch Stripers, Blues, Redfish, Snook, Seatrout, and More. Lyons Press. ISBN 9781585746057.
- Kreh, Lefty (2002). Lefty's Little Fly-Fishing Tips: 200 Innovative Ideas to Help You Catch Fish. Lyons Press. ISBN 9781585746293.
- Oglesby, Arthur; Kreh, Lefty; Ulnitz, Steen (2002). Flyfishing (Complete Guide to Fishing). Mason Crest Publishers. ISBN 9781590844953.
- Kreh, Lefty (2003). Modern Fly-Casting Methods: Decades of Fly-Casting Wisdom from America's Fly Casting Coach. Lyons Press. ISBN 9781585747894.
- Kreh, Lefty (2004). Fly Fishing for Bass: Smallmouth, Largemouth, and Exotics. Lyons Press. ISBN 9781592283101.
- Kreh, Lefty; Middleton, Harry (2005). Lefty's Favorite Fly-Fishing Waters. Lyons Press. ISBN 9781592284948.
- Rounds, Jon; Kreh, Lefty (2006). Basic Fly Fishing: All the Skills and Gear You Need to Get Started (How To Basics). Stackpole Books. ISBN 9780811733038.
- Kreh, Lefty (2006). Lefty Kreh's Ultimate Guide to Fly Fishing: Everything Anglers Need to Know by the World's Foremost Fly-Fishing Expert. Lyons Press. ISBN 9781592282388.
- Kreh, Lefty; Clouser, Bob (2007). Tying Flies that Catch Fish with Lefty Kreh & Bob Clouser ( 1-1/2 Hour Fly Tying Tutorial DVD) (DVD). Reel Resources.
- Kreh, Lefty (2008). My Life Was This Big: And Other True Fishing Tales. Skyhorse Publishing. ISBN 978-1602393592.
- Kreh, Lefty (2012). 101 Fish: A Fly Fisher's Life List. Stackpole Headwater. ISBN 9780811711487.

== Sources ==
- Biography
- Instructional video on tying Lefty's Deceiver
- Q&A With Fly-Fishing Expert Lefty Kreh
- Q&A with Lefty Kreh
- Lesson in Timelessness by a Fly-Fishing Master
- "The Big Catch: Fly-Fishing Guru 'Lefty' Kreh of Maryland is Still Making a Splash" by Dave Jamieson
- "Q&A With Bernard "Lefty" Kreh" by Samantha Carmichael
