= The American Sportsman =

American television series

The American Sportsman is an American television series that aired from 1965 to 1986 on ABC which presented filmed highlights involving the program's hosts and celebrities participating in hunting and/or fishing trips along with outdoor recreational activities such as whitewater kayaking, hang gliding and free climbing. It was typically presented on Sunday afternoons, frequently following coverage of live sporting events.

== Synopsis ==
From 1965 to 1967, the program was hosted by Joe Foss, former South Dakota Republican Governor, American Football League commissioner, and World War II hero. It was later hosted by Grits Gresham, an outdoorsman from Natchitoches, Louisiana, before its best known host, Curt Gowdy.

Some of the celebrities shown included Bing Crosby, Andy Griffith, General Jimmy Doolittle, Burt Reynolds, Larry Hagman, Phil Harris, Bert Jones, Redd Foxx, William Shatner, and Shelley Hack. Regarding the famous people who appeared on the show, Gowdy noted, “They were all wonderful sportsmen, and for many of them it was a chance for them to get away from Hollywood, the movies, entertainment, politics or sports. For me, the American Sportsman series was some of the best times in my life.”

The show has its roots in a 20-minute segment depicting Curt Gowdy and Joe Brooks fly fishing in the Andes Mountains in Argentina in 1964. The segment appeared on Wide World of Sports and immediately was spun off into its own series airing at 3 PM EST on Sundays January through March on ABC. The show's first episode was on January 31, 1965.

Episodes have been rebroadcast on ESPN Classic in recent years. A revival of the show titled The New American Sportsman ran from 2002 to 2006 on ESPN2, hosted by Rick Schroder (season one), Deion Sanders (season two) and Tom Ackerman (seasons three and four). Several members of the production team of the classic series (including executive producer Bud Morgan and head writer Pat Smith) were involved with the revival. Celebrities appearing included Morgan Freeman, Robert Duvall, Ethan Hawke, Bo Jackson, Jack Nicklaus, Kevin Costner and William Shatner (the latter of whom also appeared on the original show several times).

== Theme songs ==
The show had three themes. The version through 1973 had music and lyrics by Harry Bluestone (which started "Follow me, and find contentment" and is well remembered). The mid-1970s march was by Curtis Biever and Lou Stein. The final version which began to be used in 1979 was by Edd Kalehoff.
