= Copper John fly =

- Artificial fly
- Type: Nymph fly
- Imitates: Mayfly nymph

History
- Creator: John Barr
- Created: 1993

Materials
- Typical sizes: 10–22
- Typical hooks: Mustad 9671, TMC 5262, Dai-Riki 730 1x or 2x long shank with 2x heavy wire)
- Thread: Black 6/0 or 8/0
- Tail: Two brown goose or turkey biots
- Wing: Wing case: Thin Skin or turkey tail topped with 1 strand of Krystal Flash or two or three strands of Flashabou. Coat with epoxy.
- Ribbing: Brassie-sized Ultra-Wire in copper or color of choice
- Thorax: Peacock herl
- Legs: Mottled partridge or hen saddle fibers
- Bead: Gold-colored tungsten bead

Uses
- Primary use: Trout

Reference(s)
- Pattern references: Barr, John in Mid Current

The Copper John is a nymph type artificial fly used in fly fishing. It was created by John Barr of Boulder, Colorado in the 1990s. It is popular amongst fly tyers and numerous variations have been created. Use of a tungsten bead, wire, and sometimes lead makes this slim nymph fly drop fast in the water to the depths where the fish are located and is often fished in murky water. The Copper John is a general imitation of the nymph state of a Mayfly.

== Origin ==
The original Copper John fly was first tied by John Barr of Boulder in 1993. It underwent several variations until finalized in 1996. The original fly was tied with Turkey biots for the wing case and without epoxy over it. Later, as "Thin Skin" material and epoxy resins became available, they were substituted until the fly was finalized. The original was tied without a taper in the body but later changed to a slight taper using thread under the wire wrappings. The original was tied with copper wire and is now commonly tied using green, pink, blue, or other colored wires to match the size of the hook.

== Fishing ==
The relatively heavy weight and thin profile of this fly allows it to descend fast in the water. It is often used as a dropper fly in a hopper-dropper fly combination. It is particularly useful when used to fish for trout in discolored water. Smaller sizes of the fly are fished in the Fall and Spring and larger versions are fished in the summer when food is more available.
