= Colibri (disambiguation) =

Colibri is the genus of violetear hummingbirds.

Colibri may also refer to:

- Colibri Group, suppliers of cigarette lighters and other items
- Colibri (film), a 1924 German silent film
- COLIBRI, a Lisp machine
- Rey Mysterio (born 1974), American wrestler whose early ring name was Colibri
- "El Colibrí", guitar piece by Julio Salvador Sagreras

== Transport ==
- Brügger Colibri, a family of sports aircraft
- Eurocopter Colibri, a helicopter
- HMS Colibri, several vessels of the Royal Navy
  - HMS Colibri (1809), a captured French-built naval sloop in the Royal Navy
- IMA Colibri, a one-person electric vehicle
- I.Ae. 31 Colibrí, an Argentine civil trainer aircraft
- Leopoldoff Colibri, a biplane

== See also ==
- Colibri del Sol Bird Reserve, a nature reserve in Colombia
- Colibríes de Morelos, a short-lived Mexican association football team
- Kolibri (disambiguation)
- Calibri, a typeface family
