= Boat building =

Design and construction of floating vessels

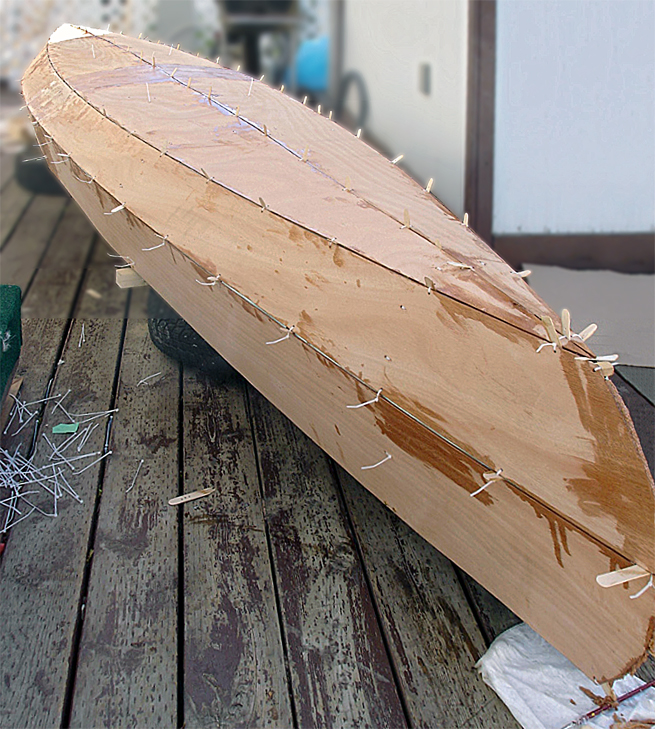
A canoe being built with the stitch and glue method

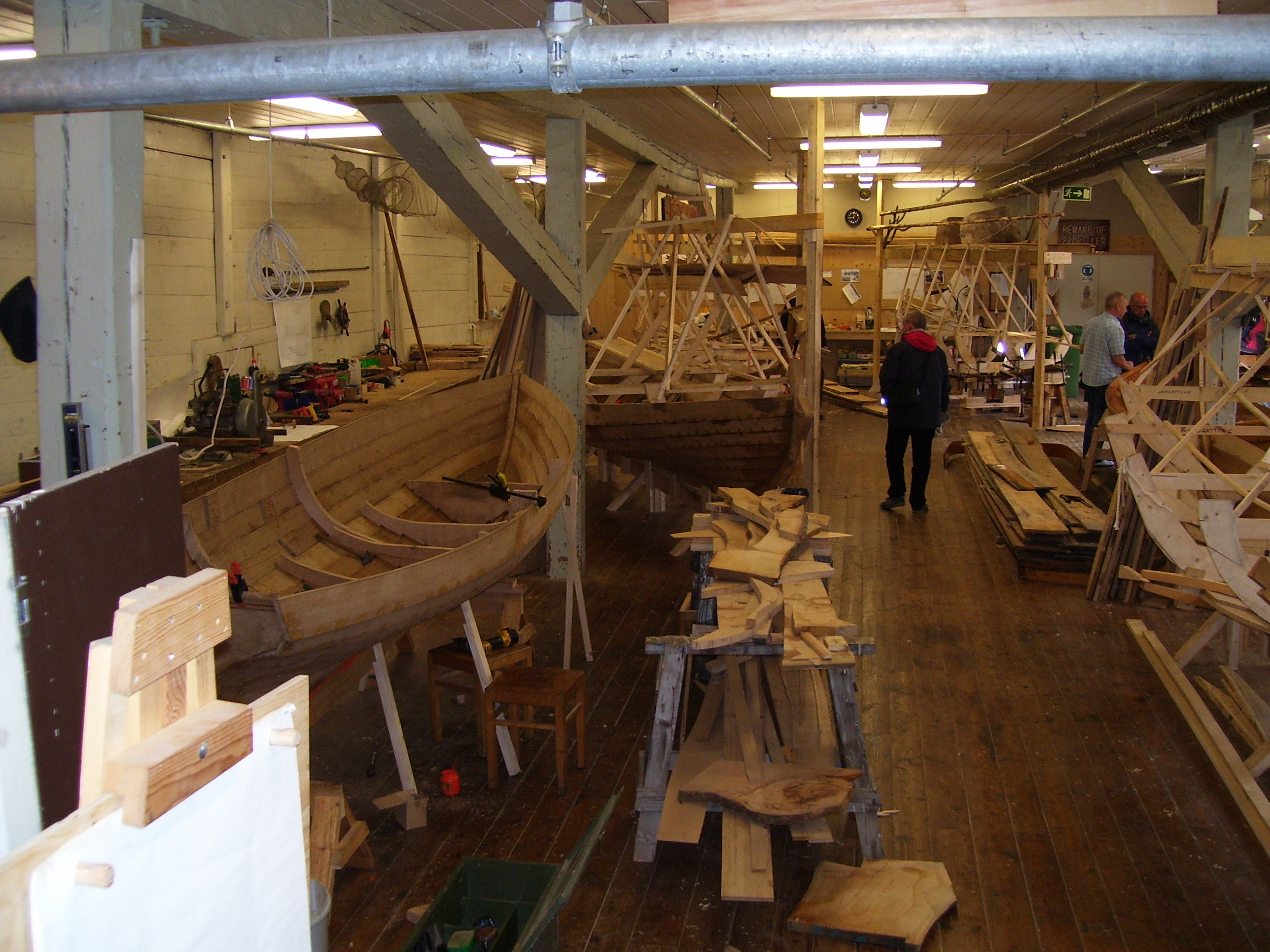
A workshop building traditional wooden boats

Boat building is the design and construction of boats (instead of the larger ships) — and their on-board systems. This includes at minimum the construction of a hull, with any necessary propulsion, mechanical, navigation, safety and other service systems as the craft requires.

The boat building industry provides for the design, manufacturing, repair and modification of human-powered watercraft, sailboats, motorboats, airboats and submersibles, and caters for various demands from recreational (e.g. launches, dinghies and yachts), commercial (e.g. tour boats, ferry boats and lighters), residential (houseboats), to professional (e.g. fishing boats, tugboats, lifeboats and patrol boats).

== Construction materials and methods ==
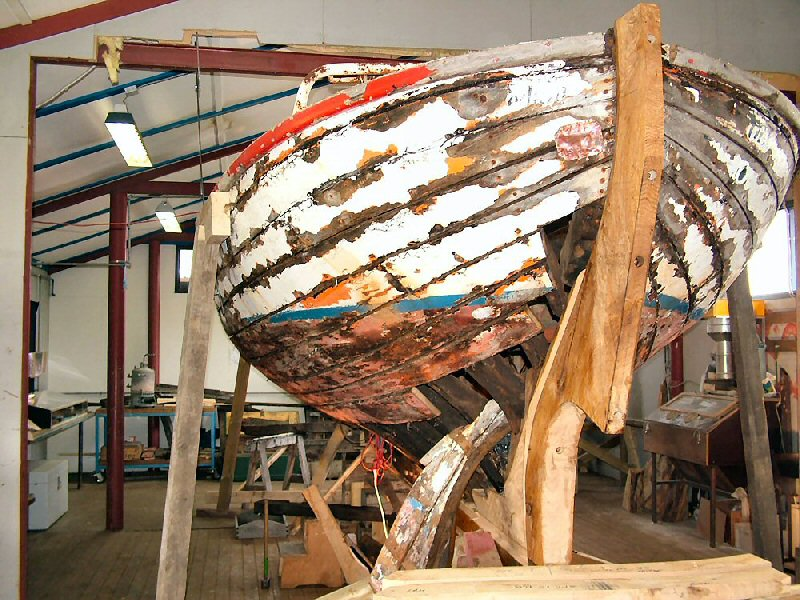
Damaged boat mid-reconstruction; carvel planking partially removed

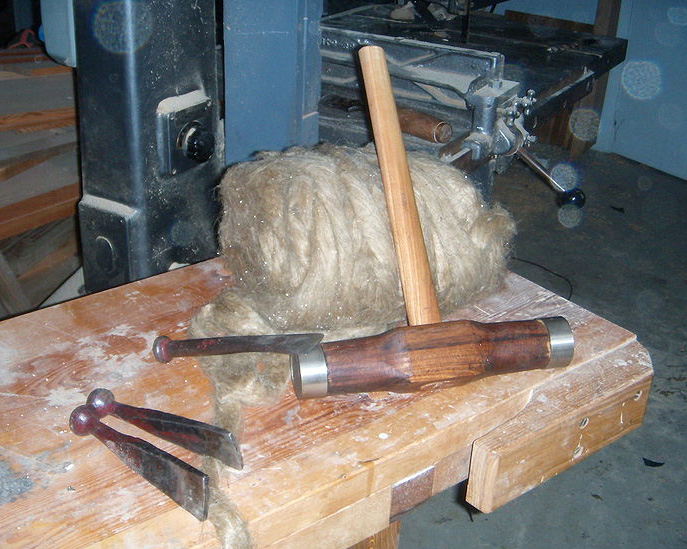
Caulking irons and oakum

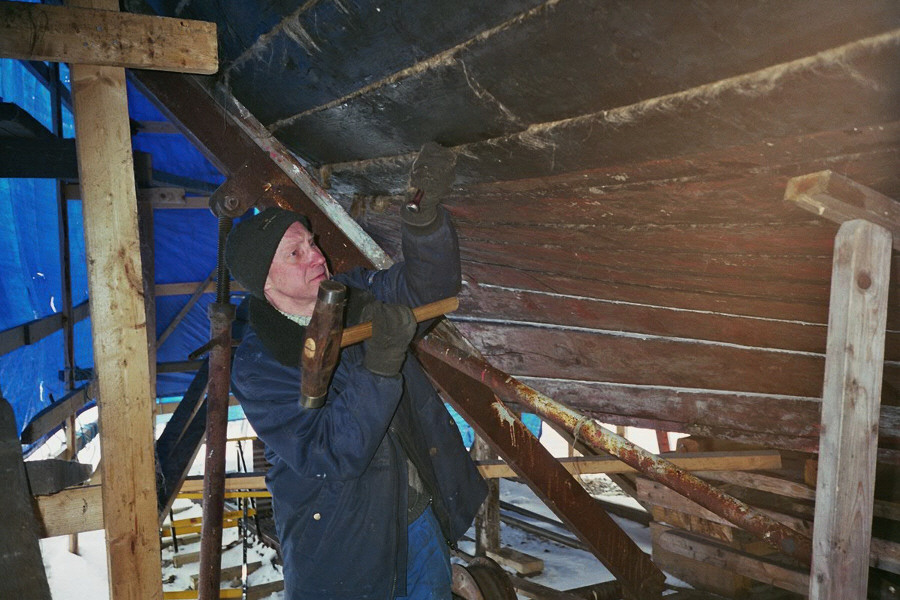
Caulking a wooden boat

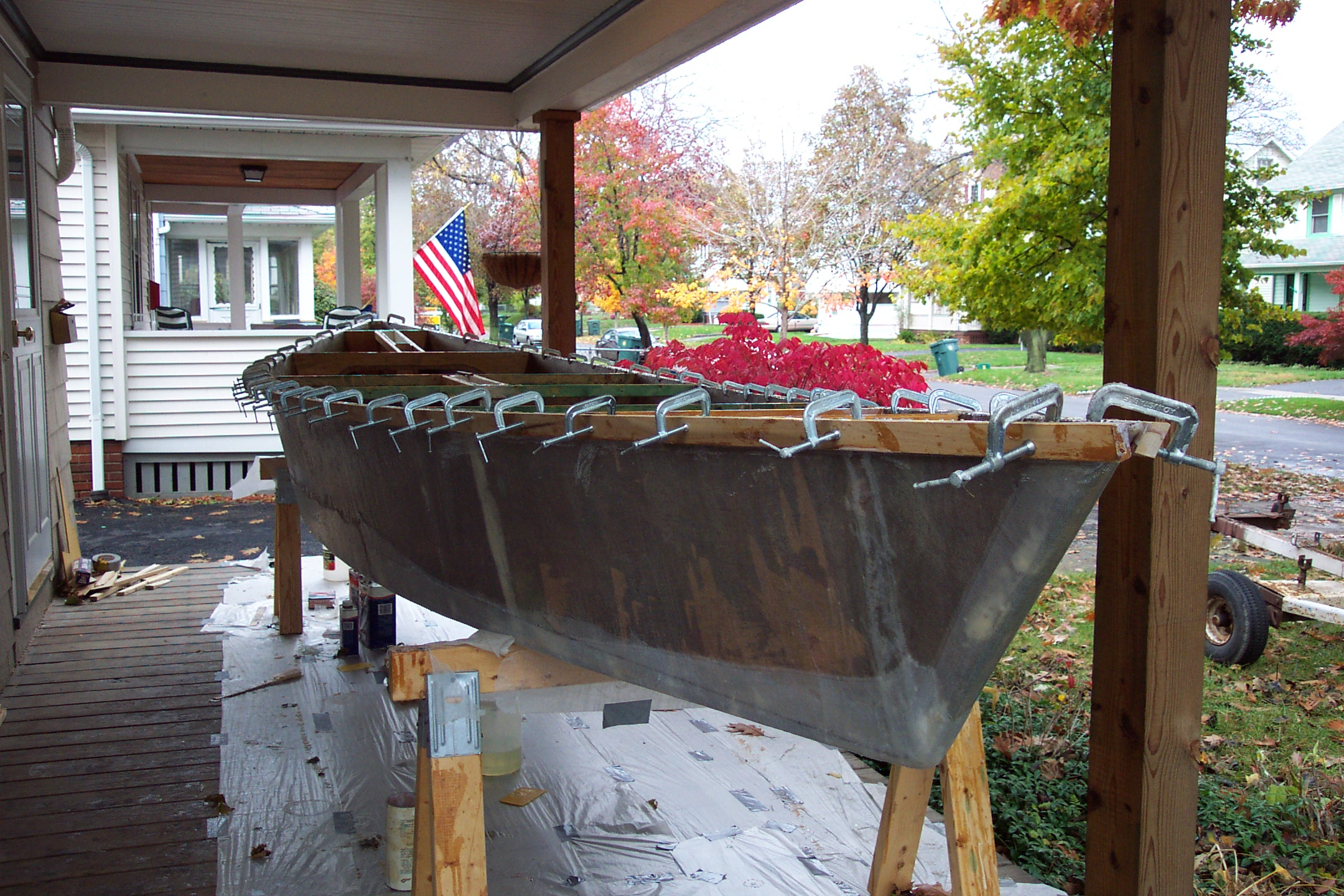
A sheet plywood sailboat during construction

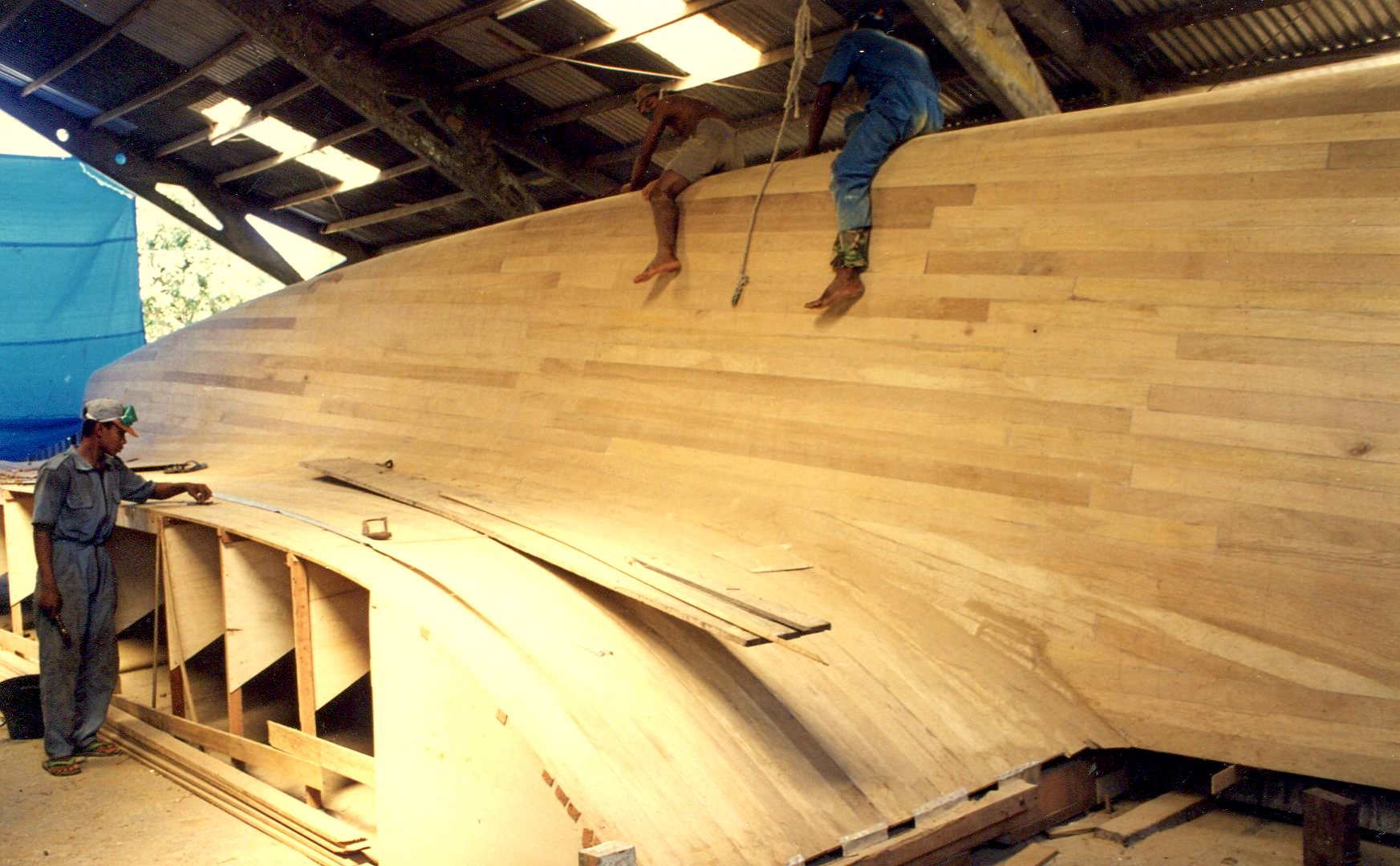
Brady 45' strip-built catamaran under construction

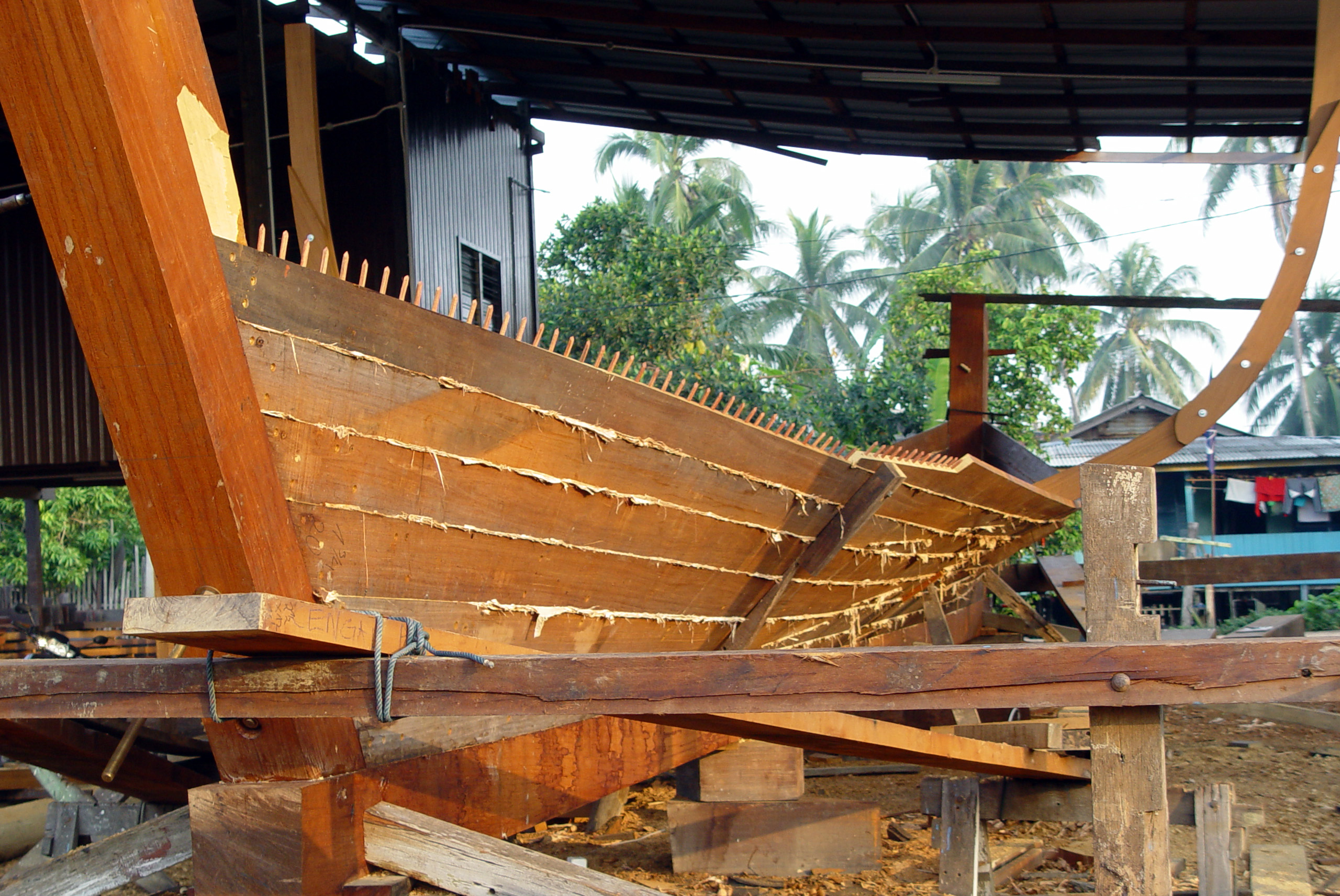
Construction of the Naga Pelangi in 2004, a Malaysian pinas, using traditional edge-dowelled techniques. Note the protruding dowels on the upper edges of the planks and the fiber caulking in the seams. The ribs will be added once the shell is complete.

=== Wood ===
Wood is the traditional boat building material used for hull and spar construction. It is buoyant, widely available and easily worked. It is a popular material for small boats (of e.g. 6-metre (20 ft) length; such as dinghies and sailboats). Its abrasion resistance varies according to the hardness and density of the wood and it can deteriorate if fresh water or marine organisms are allowed to penetrate the wood. Woods such as teak, totara and some cedars have natural chemicals which prevent rot whereas other woods, such as Pinus radiata, will rot very quickly. The hull of a wooden boat usually consists of planking fastened to frames and a keel. Keel and frames are traditionally made of hardwoods such as oak while planking can be oak but is more often softwood such as pine, larch or cedar.

Traditional wood construction techniques can be classified into the "shell-first" method (also called "planking first") and the "frame first" method. With "shell first", the form of the hull is determined by joining shaped planks that are fastened together, followed by reinforcing the structure with the frames (or ribs) that are fitted to the inside. With "frame first", the hull shape is established by setting up the frames on the keel and then fastening the planking on the outside.

Some types of wood construction include:

- Carvel, in which a smooth hull is formed by fastening flush-fitting planks to underlying frames. The planks may be curved in cross section like barrel staves. Carvel planks are generally caulked with oakum or cotton that is driven into the seams between the planks and covered with some waterproof substance. It takes its name from the caravel and is believed to have originated in the Mediterranean. A number of boat building texts are available which describe the carvel planking method in detail.
- Clinker is a planking-first technique closely associated with Nordic countries, though used over a wider area of Northern Europe. Wooden planks are fixed to each other with a slight overlap that is beveled for a tight fit. The planks are mechanically connected to each other with copper rivets, bent over iron nails, screws or in modern boats with adhesives. Often, steam bent wooden ribs are fitted inside the hull.
- Strip planking is yet another type of wooden boat construction similar to carvel. It is a glued construction method which is very popular with amateur boatbuilders as it is quick, avoids complex temporary jig work and does not require shaping of the planks.
- Sheet plywood boat building uses sheets of plywood panels usually fixed to longitudinal long wood such the chines, inwhales (sheer clamps) or intermediate stringers which are all bent around a series of frames. By attaching the ply sheets to the longwood rather than directly to the frames this avoids hard spots or an unfair hull. Plywood may be laminated into a round hull or used in single sheets. These hulls generally have one or more chines and the method is called Ply on Frame construction. A subdivision of the sheet plywood boat building method is known as the stitch-and-glue method, where pre-shaped panels of plywood are drawn together then edge glued and reinforced with fibreglass without the use of a frame. Metal or plastic ties, nylon fishing line or copper wires pull curved flat panels into three-dimensional curved shapes. These hulls generally have one or more chines. Marine grade plywood of good quality is designated "WBP" (which stands for water- and boiled-proof) or more usually BS 1088. Australian plywood manufacturers and suppliers have issued warnings that some Asian nations are selling ply stamped BS 1088 which does not meet international standards. Specifically, they say outer plies are too thin (should be 1.2 mm or 0.047 in minimum) or are very thin (less than 0.5 mm or 0.020 in) or high-grade surface ply such as Okoume is combined with a much heavier and wider inner cores. Most high-grade marine Okoume (Gaboon) ply uses lightweight poplar inner cores. Often the 1088 stamp is blurred in the poor Asian ply so it is not clear. In Australia and New Zealand a higher-grade marine ply than BS1088 is AS2272. It requires both faces to be "A" quality, with even-thickness plies. The most common plywood used for this grade is plantation-grown hoop pine which is fine grained, very smooth, moderately light (at 570 kg/m^{3} or 36 lb/cu ft it is the same weight as Meranti ply and about 13% heavier than genuine poplar cored BS1088 Okoume). Hoop pine has a very high stress rating of F17, indicating high strength. Meranti (Lauan) ply has a stress rating of F14 and Okoume ply F8. Okoume ply is commonly coated with epoxy to increase strength and impact resistance as well as to exclude water. Both types of plywood construction are very popular with amateur builders, and many dinghies such as the Vaurien, Cherub, Tolman, Moth and P class (ply on frame construction) and FJs, FDs and Kolibris (stitch-and-glue method) have been built from it. Another variation is tortured ply where very thin(3 mm or 0.12 in) and flexible (often Okoume)preshaped panels ply are bent into compound curves and sewn together. Little or no framework or longitudinal wood is used. This method is mainly confined to kayaks.
- Cold moulding is a composite method of wooden boat building that uses two or more layers of thin wood, called veneers, oriented in different directions, resulting in a strong monocoque structure, similar to a fibreglass hull but substantially lighter. Sometimes composed of a base layer of strip planking followed by multiple veneers. Sometimes just veneers are used. Cold-moulding is popular in small, medium and very large, wooden super-yachts. Using different types of wood, the builder can lighten some areas such as bow and stern and strengthen other high-stress areas. Sometimes cold-moulded hulls are protected either inside or out or both with fibreglass or similar products for impact resistance, especially when lightweight, soft timber such as cedar is used. This method lends itself to great flexibility in hull shape.
  Cold-moulded refers to a type of building one-off hulls using thin strips of wood applied to a series of forms at 45-degree angles to the centerline. This method is often called double-diagonal because a minimum of two layers is recommended, each occurring at opposing 45-degree angles. The "hot-moulded" method of building boats, which used ovens to heat and cure the resin, has not been widely used since World War II; and now almost all curing is done at room temperature.

=== Metal ===
==== Iron and steel ====
Either used in sheet or alternatively, plate for all-metal hulls or for isolated structural members. It is strong, but heavy (despite the fact that the thickness of the hull can be less). It is generally about 30% heavier than aluminium and somewhat more heavy than polyester. The material rusts unless protected from water (this is usually done by means of a covering of paint). Modern steel components are welded or bolted together. As the welding can be done very easily (with common welding equipment), and as the material is very cheap, it is a popular material with amateur builders. Also, amateur builders which are not yet well established in building steel ships may opt for DIY construction kits. If steel is used, a zinc layer is often applied to coat the entire hull. It is applied after sandblasting (which is required to have a cleaned surface) and before painting. The painting is usually done with lead paint (Pb_{3}O_{4}). Optionally, the covering with the zinc layer may be left out, but it is generally not recommended. Zinc anodes also need to be placed on the ship's hull. Until the mid-1900s, steel sheets were riveted together.

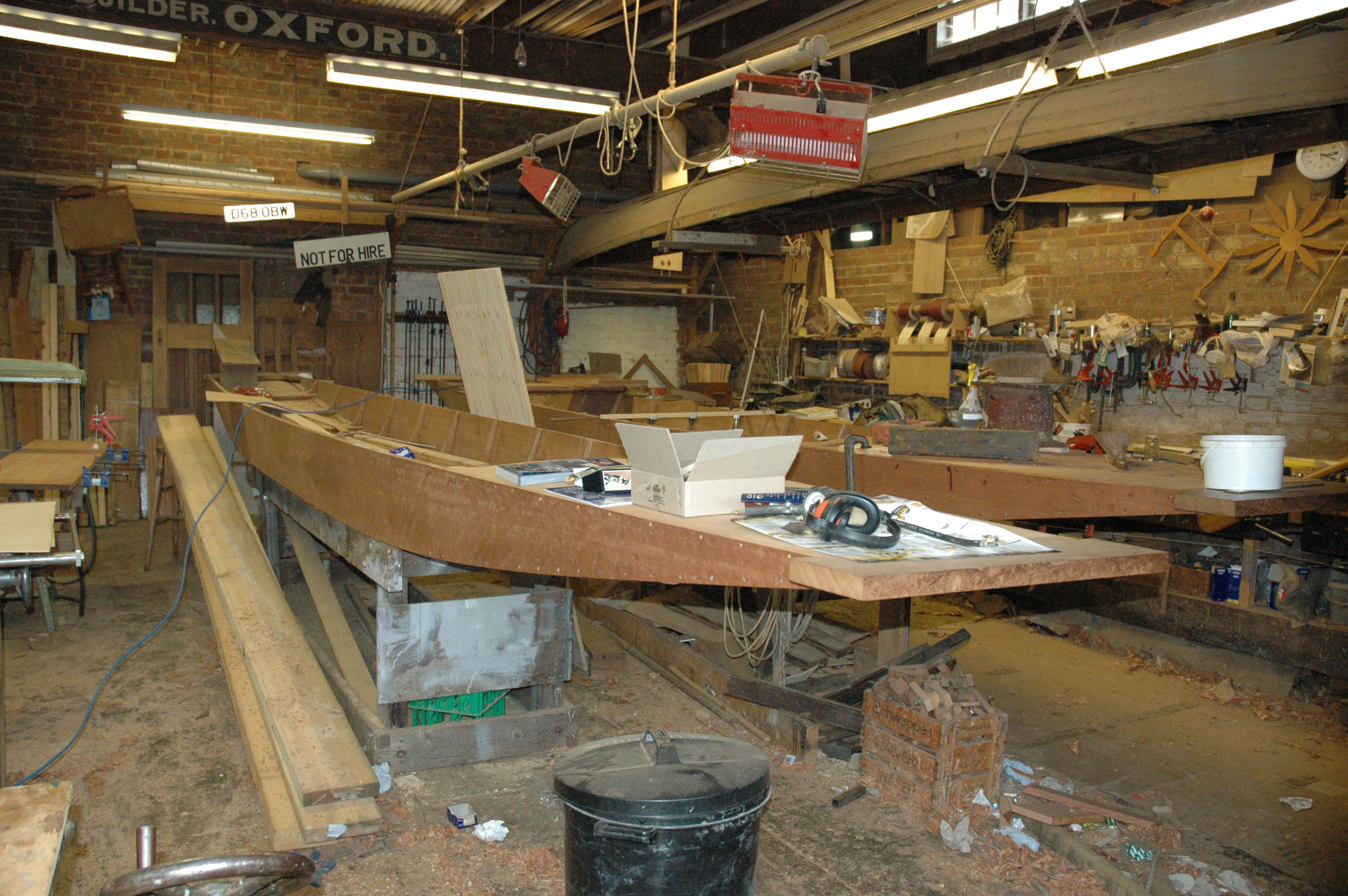
A punt under construction

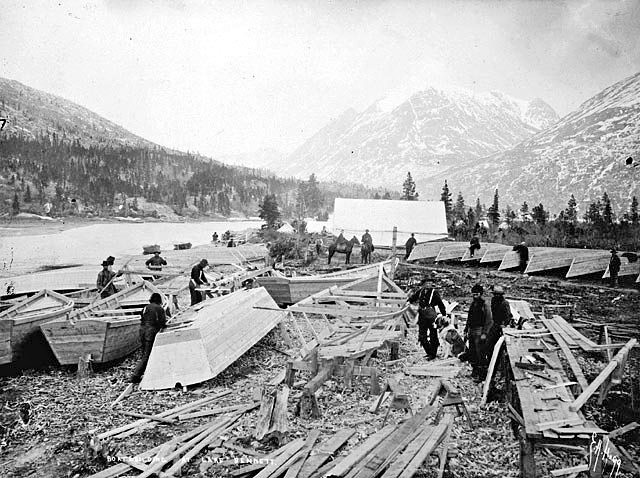
Wooden boats under construction during the Klondike Gold Rush

==== Aluminum ====
Aluminum and aluminum alloys are used both in sheet form for all-metal hulls or for isolated structural members. Many sailing spars are frequently made of aluminium after 1960. It is the lightest material for building large boats (being 15–20% lighter than polyester and 30% lighter than steel). Aluminium is relatively cheap in comparison with wood or steel in most countries. In addition it is relatively easy to cut, bend and weld. Galvanic corrosion below the waterline in salt water is a serious concern, particularly in marinas where there are other conflicting metals. Aluminium is most commonly found in yachts, pontoon and power boats that are not kept permanently in the water. Aluminium yachts are particularly popular in France.

==== Cupronickel ====
A relatively expensive metal used only very occasionally in boatbuilding is cupronickel. Cupronickel is reasonably tough, highly resistant to corrosion in seawater, and is (because of its copper content) an antifouling metal. Cupronickel may be found on the hulls of premium tugboats, fishing boats and other working boats; and may even be used for propellers and propeller shafts.

=== Fiberglass ===
Fiberglass (glass-reinforced plastic or GRP) is typically used for production boats because of its ability to reuse a female mould as the foundation for the shape of the boat. The resulting structure is strong in tension but often needs to be either laid up with many heavy layers of resin-saturated fiberglass or reinforced with wood or foam in order to provide stiffness. GRP hulls are largely free of corrosion though not normally fireproof. These can be solid fiberglass or of the sandwich (cored) type, in which a core of balsa, foam or similar material is applied after the outer layer of fiberglass is laid to the mould, but before the inner skin is laid. This is similar to the next type, composite, but is not usually classified as composite, since the core material in this case does not provide much additional strength. It does, however, increase stiffness, which means that less resin and fiberglass cloth can be used in order to save weight. Most fibreglass boats are currently made in an open mould, with fibreglass and resin applied by hand (hand-lay-up method). Some are now constructed by vacuum infusion where the fibres are laid out and resin is pulled into the mould by atmospheric pressure. This can produce stronger parts with more glass and less resin, but takes special materials and more technical knowledge. Older fibreglass boats before 1990 were often not constructed in controlled temperature buildings leading to the widespread problem of fibreglass pox, where seawater seeped through small holes and caused delamination. The name comes from the multitude of surface pits in the outer gelcoat layer which resembles smallpox. Sometimes the problem was caused by atmospheric moisture being trapped in the layup during construction in humid weather.

=== Modern Composite Materials ===
The 21st century has seen the introduction of advanced composite materials in boat construction. Carbon fiber composites offer exceptional strength-to-weight ratios and are increasingly used in high-performance sailing yachts and racing boats. Kevlar reinforcement provides impact resistance and is commonly used in kayaks and canoes.

Sustainable materials have gained prominence, with manufacturers incorporating flax fiber, hemp fiber, and bio-based resins to reduce environmental impact. Recycled materials, including PET foam cores from plastic bottles, are increasingly used in sandwich construction.

=== Composite material ===
"Composite construction" involves a variety of composite materials and methods: an early example was a timber carvel skin attached to a frame and deck beams made of iron. Sheet copper anti-fouling ("copper bottomed") could be attached to a wooden hull provided the risk of galvanic corrosion was minimised. Fast cargo vessels once were copper-bottomed to prevent being slowed by marine fouling. GRP and ferrocement hulls are classic composite hulls, the term "composite" applies also to plastics reinforced with fibers other than glass. When a hull is being created in a female mould, the composite materials are applied to the mould in the form of a thermosetting plastic (usually epoxy, polyester, or vinylester) and some kind of fiber cloth (fiberglass, kevlar, dynel, carbon fiber, etc.). These methods can give strength-to-weight ratios approaching that of aluminum, while requiring less specialized tools and construction skills.

=== Modern digital manufacturing ===
The 21st century has seen significant digitization in boat building through computer-aided design (CAD), CNC machining, and 3D printing. CNC machines are increasingly used for cutting aluminum panels, steel plates, and composite materials with precision previously unachievable by hand.

3D printing technology has emerged for producing boat hulls, molds, and components. The first functional large-format 3D-printed monolithic catamaran was completed in 2025, demonstrating the potential for additive manufacturing to reduce production times and material waste.

=== Ferrocement ===
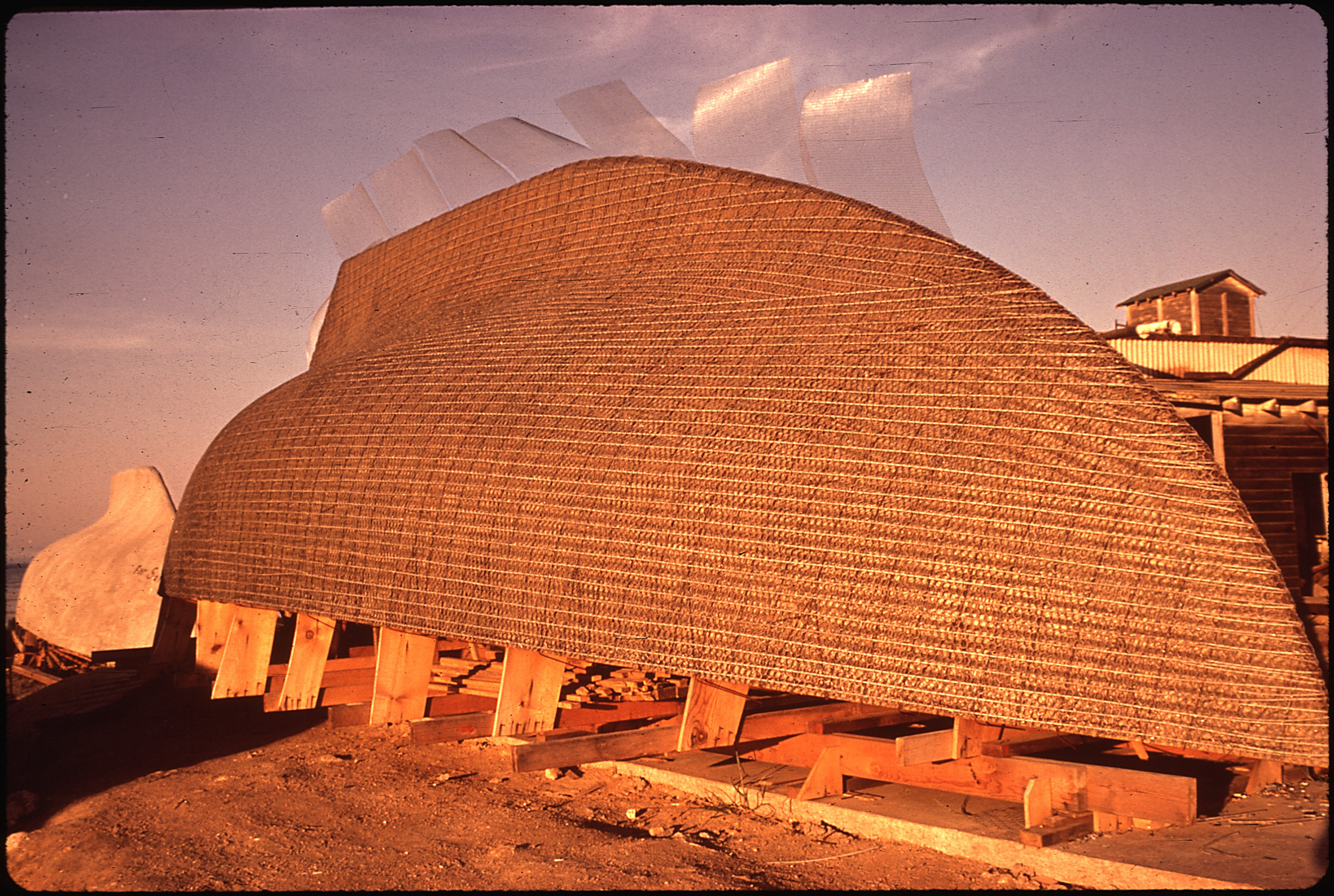
A ferrocement hull being built. The steel armature approaches readiness for the cement/sand mix to be applied.

First developed in the mid-19th century in both France and Holland, ferrocement was also used for the D-Day Mulberry harbours. After a buzz of excitement among homebuilders in the 1960s, ferro building has since declined.

Ferrocement is a relatively cheap method to produce a hull, although unsuitable for commercial mass production. A steel and iron "armature" is built to the exact shape of the hull, ultimately being covered in galvanised chicken netting. Then, on a single day, the cement is applied by a team of plasterers. The cement:sand ratio is a very rich 4:1. As the hull thickness is typically 2.5 to 3 cms, ferrocement is unsuitable for boats less than about 15 metres LOA as there is a weight penalty; above that length there is no penalty. Properly plastered ferrocement boats have smooth hulls with fine lines, and amateur builders are advised to use professional plasterers to produce a smooth finish. In the 1960s and 1970s, particularly in Australia and New Zealand, the cheapness of ferro construction encouraged amateur builders to build hulls larger than they could afford, not anticipating that the fitting-out costs of a larger boat can be crippling.

The advantages of a ferro hull are:

- cannot burn, rot, or rust and no osmosis
- good insulation: cool in summer, warm in winter
- tougher than GRP, and almost as tough as a steel vessel; (and if damaged, easily repaired almost anywhere in the world)
- properly built, a ferro hull is as fair as a GRP hull.
- they may be cheap to buy (see disadvantages, below)

The disadvantages are:

- many home-built ferro boats are lumpy, overweight and ugly.
- some early builders, realising that their creation proved to be disappointing, scuttled their vessels and fraudulently claimed insurance.
- accordingly, ferro yachts may be difficult to sell and nigh impossible to insure.

See also: concrete ship, concrete canoe.

== Hull types ==
There are many hull types, and a builder should choose the most appropriate one for the boat's intended purpose. For example, a sea-going vessel needs a hull which is more stable and robust than a hull used in rivers and canals. Hull types include:

Modern hull design increasingly utilizes computational fluid dynamics (CFD) for optimizing hydrodynamic performance. Multi-chine hulls allow approximation of round hull shapes using flat panels, popular in aluminum construction.

Foiling hulls incorporate hydrofoil technology for reduced drag and higher speeds, while wave-piercing hulls minimize slamming in rough conditions through specialized bow designs.

- Smooth curve hull: these are rounded and free of chines or corners.
- Chined hulls: these hulls have flat panels (typically plywood) which meet at a sharp angle known as the "chine". Chined hulls range from simple flat-bottomed boats where the topsides and bottom meet at about 110 degrees (such as banks dories and sharpies) to skiffs where the bottom is arced rather than flat. Multi-chine hulls allow an approximation of a round hull shape.
- Flat-bottomed hull: flat-bottomed hulls are suitable for canals and non-tidal rivers. They are often shallow-draft, and may operate in shallower water. They are cheap to build but, being less stable and having no keel to give directional stability, they are unsuitable for sea-going vessels. (However, large ships are almost always flat bottomed, having a suitably large draft to overcome the problems of small flat-bottomed boats).
- Displacement hulls: a displacement hull always remains partly submerged. Such a hull has a maximum "hull speed" which is a function of its waterline length. An exception is the catamaran, whose twin hulls are usually so fine that they do not engender a bow wave.
- Planing hulls: planing hulls have a shape that allows the boat to rise out of the water as the speed increases. Sail boats that plane are typical V-shaped at the bows and flat-bottomed aft. Hydroplanes are very light, flat bottomed, high powered speed boats that plane easily on flat water, but they become unstable in rough water. Powerboats designed for rough water are usually deep V-bottomed with a deadrise angle of about 20–23 degrees. The most common form is to have at least one chine to allow for stability when cornering and for a supportive surface on which to ride while planing. Planing hulls allow much higher speeds to be achieved, as they are not limited by the waterline length the way displacement hulls are. Planing hulls need sufficient power to "reach the plane", after which the lack of drag allows high speeds yet with reduced power consumption.

== Glossary ==
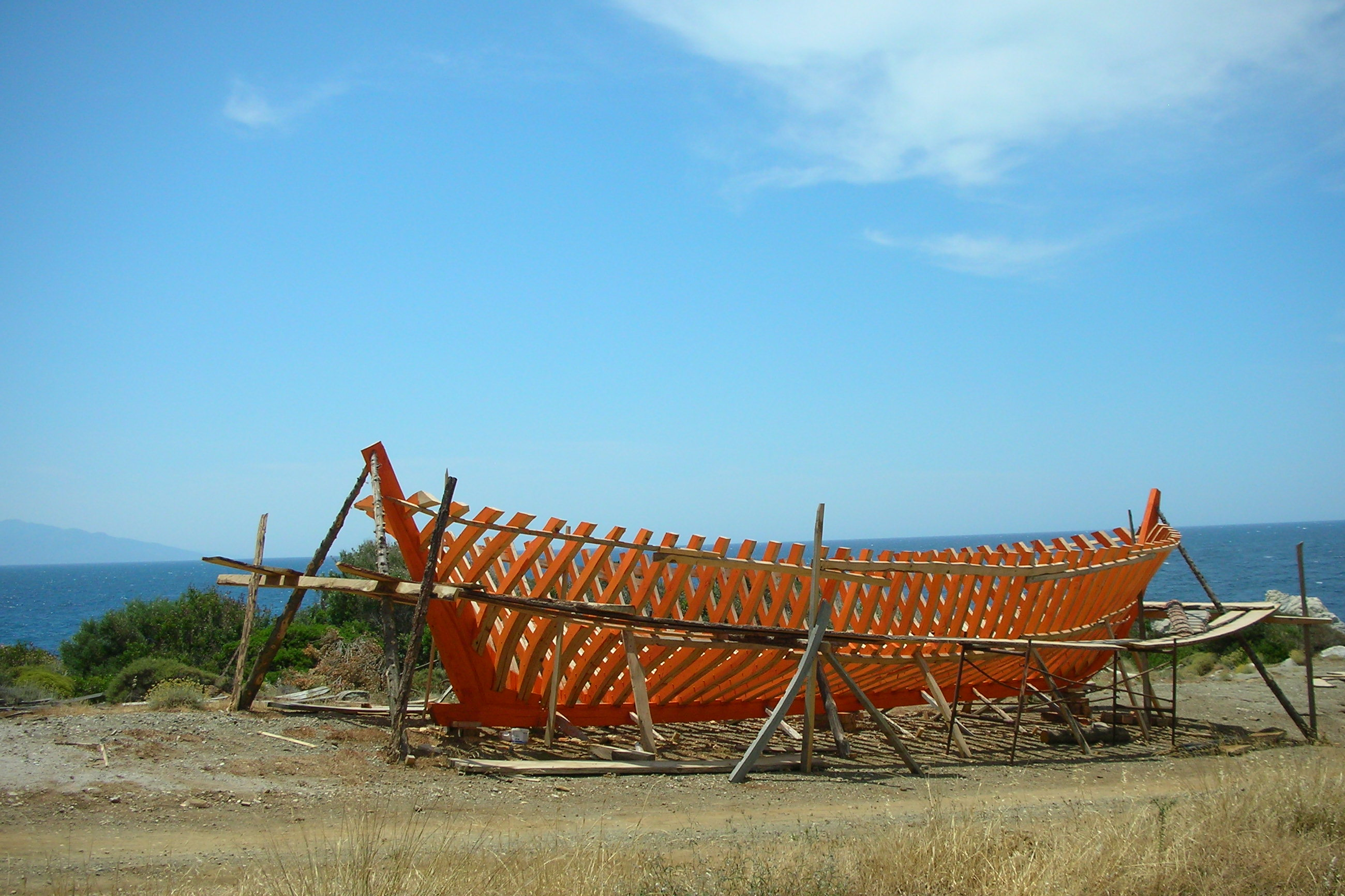
Traditional boat under construction in Greece

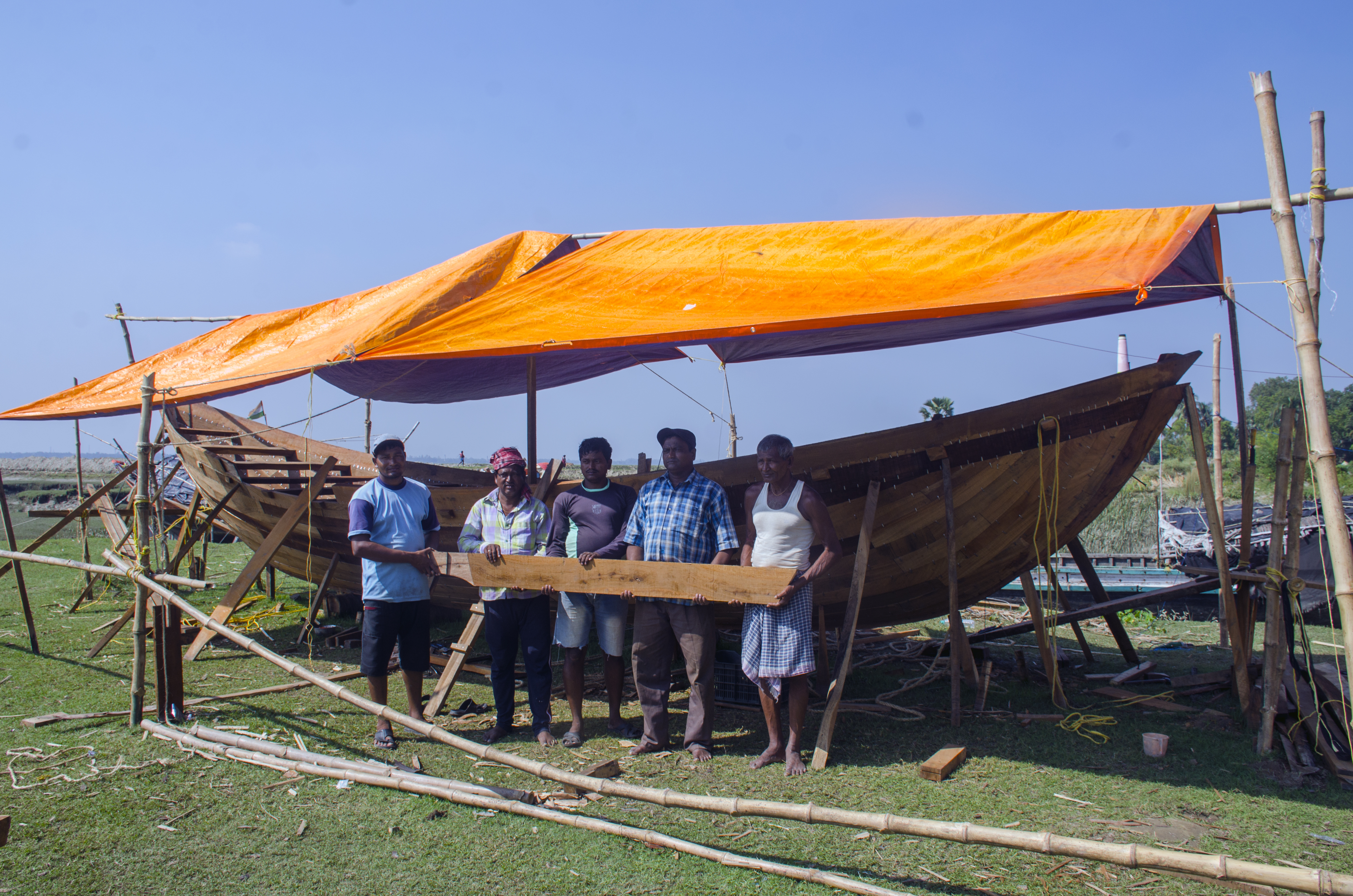
Traditional boat under construction in West Bengal, India

- Anchor: a device for holding a boat to the seabed, typically with chain and rope. Traditional anchors include the fisherman, Danforth, and plough types (such as the "CQR" and "Delta"). Recently, far more effective anchors with more reliable holding include the "Rocna" and the "Ultra", both of which are spade anchors.
- Bitts: a pair of short strong posts of wood or steel on the deck of a boat intended to take mooring lines. Also called "bollards".
- Bilge: the lowest part of the interior of a hull. Water, fuel tanks, ballast, and heavy stores are variously placed in the bilge to lower the craft's centre of gravity.
- Bilge keels: a pair of short keels fitted on either side of the hull. Less hydro-dynamically efficient than a fin keel, they have a shallower draft. Full-length bilge keels add rigidity to a hull. Bilge keel craft are found in areas with large tidal ranges to keep the vessel upright when dried out.
- Bilge pump: a manual or electric pump for draining the bilge. Set at the lowest point, its inlet is protected by a screen to minimize blockages.
- Block: a pulley used to give a line a fair lead and multiply its hauling power. Single and double sheave blocks are common, triple rare.
- Bobstay: a stay attached between the stem and outer end of a bowsprit to prevent it from rising under the tension of sail.
- Bow: The forward end of a watercraft.
- Bowsprit: a spar that extends forward of the stem to provide an anchor for a jib.
- Breasthook: A roughly triangular component located immediately aft of the stem and between the inwales, sheer clamps, or rails of a small boat.
- Bulkhead: internal transverse walls dividing a hull.
- Bulwarks: topsides which extend above the deck, often capped with a rail and fitted with scuppers.
- Cam cleat: a mechanical device for holding a line fast between two spring-loaded jaws.
- Catheads: timbers protruding approximately at right angles from the foredeck to support an anchor outboard of the hull.
- Capstan: a vertical winch secured to the foredeck, used primarily to hoist an anchor.
- Carlin: a longitudinal strip parallel to, but inboard of, the inwale (sheer clamp) for supporting the inboard edge of the side deck and the side of the cabin cladding.
- Chainplate: a metal bracket through-bolted through the hull for anchoring a shroud.
- Centreboard: (also dagger board) a movable keel which may be raised and lowered to accommodate shallow water and point of sail. It is held in place within a centerboard trunk.
- Chine: the part of a hull at the turn of the bilge. It may be "hard" (i.e. sharply angled) or "soft" (gradually contoured). A chine made of a single timber is known as a chine log.
- Cleat: a fitting designed to tie off lines. The most common form has a central anchor point and opposing protrusions for taking turns of a line. Also cam and jam cleats.
- Coaming: any vertical surface on a ship designed to deflect or prevent entry of water
- Cockpit: the seating area aft in a small decked vessel where the helm is.
- Counter stern: a stern rising well above the waterline ending in a point or rounded contour rather than a vertical transom. A variation is the "truncated counter".
- Companionway: a passage, fitted with either steps or a ladder, for transiting between decks.
- Crosstree: a form of spreader mounted athwarts a mast for attaching or tensioning shrouds or stays.
- Deck: a structure covering part or all of a hull, supported by beams.
- Deck beam: A beam for supporting the deck.
- Dolphin striker: a short downward-facing spar fitted mid-way along a bowsprit to tension the bobstay.
- Dorade box: a ventilation intake consisting of a pivoting cowling atop a deck mounted self-draining box, named after the 1931 yacht Dorade where it was first used.
- Epoxy resin: a two-part thermosetting polymer increasingly used in modern wooden boat building variously as an adhesive, filler (admixed with other materials), and a moisture-resistant barrier in hull and deck construction, sometimes applied in conjunction with reinforcing cloths such as fibreglass, kevlar or carbon fibre.
- Fairlead: a deck fitting for redirecting a line and minimizing chafe.
- Fiddle (or fiddle rail). a low rail on a counter, stove, or table for preventing items from sliding off when the boat is heeled at sea. Catamarans have less need than monohulls for fiddles.
- Freeboard: the part of the hull between the waterline and deck of a vessel.
- Furling headsail: a jib or other headsail attached to a rotating mechanism that furls and unfurls it, manually or automatically.
- Garboard: the strake immediately on either side of the keel.
- Gimbal: a device that allows a stove or compass to self-level by pivoting in two horizontal planes simultaneously.
- Gooseneck: a pivoting metal fitting that joins a boom to a mast. Many goosenecks can be adjusted to trim the luff of a sail.
- Grab rail: an extended horizontal handhold, usually atop a cabin.
- Gudgeon: the female part of a pintle-and-gudgeon pivot or hinge, characteristically used to attach a rudder to a vessel.
- Gunwale: (pronounced "gunnel") the upper longitudinal structural member of the hull, typically fitted with scuppers to drain the deck.
- Hatch: an opening in the deck or cabin of a vessel, with a hinged, sliding, or removable cover.
- Heads: a marine toilet, deriving from toileting at the catsheads in square rigger days.
- Hull: the bottom and sides of a vessel.
- Inwale (or "sheer clamp"): the upper, inner longitudinal structural member of the hull, to which topside panels are fixed.
- Keel: the main structural member of a traditional vessel, running fore and aft from bow to stern on its centerline. It provides ballast for stability, and resistance to leeway moving through the water.
- Keelson: an internal beam fixed to the top of the keel to strengthen the joint of the upper members of the boat to the keel.
- King plank: the central board of a foredeck. Its sides are notched to receive the tapered forward ends of deck planking so that no end grain is exposed.
- Knee: a short L-shaped piece of wood that joins or strengthens the joint in boat parts that meet between roughly 60 and 120 degrees. It may be a natural crook from a suitable wood species, sawn from a larger piece of timber, or laminated to size. Commonly used on thwarts to join topsides or keelsons to join transoms. A hanging knee sits upright beneath a thwart to support it. Hanging knees often support carlins where a full frame would be inconvenient.
- Locker: an enclosed storage space
- Mast: a large vertical spar which supports the sails. It may be supported by standing rigging, but some rigs (such a junks) have unstayed masted.
- Mast step: a socket to take the downward thrust of the mast and hold it in position. May be on the keel or on the deck in smaller craft. A deck-stepped mast may be supported by a column below the deck.
- Mizzen: the aftmost mast and sail in a yawl or ketch, or in a vessel with three or more masts.
- Oar a wooden pole enlarged on one end to resist the water when pulled.
- Painter: a short line at the bow of a small boat for tying it off.
- Parrot beak: a spring-loaded stainless steel fitting on the end of a spinnaker pole attaching it to the sail.
- Pintle: the male half of a pintle-and-gudgeon pivot or hinge.
- Ratlines (traditionally ratlins): lines woven horizontally between the shrouds of a square-rigged ship to provide footholds for ascending to the yards.
- Rib: a thin strip of pliable timber laid athwarts inside a hull from inwale to inwale at regular close intervals to reinforce its planking. Ribs differ from frames or futtocks in being far smaller dimensions and bent in place compared to frames or futtocks, which are normally sawn to shape, or natural crooks that are shaped to fit with an adze, axe or chisel.
- Rigging: standing rigging (either "stays" or shrouds") are the wire cables or rods that support the mast(s). Running rigging are the ropes ("sheets") to control the sails.
- Rowlock (pronounced "rollock";(also "oarlock"): a U-shaped metal device that secures an oar and acts as a fulcrum during the motion of rowing.
- Rudder: a hinged vertical plate at the stern for steering a craft. There may be more than one rudder.
- Sampson post: a strong vertical post which supports a ship's windlass and the heel of its bowsprit, also used to making off mooring lines.
- Scuppers: gaps in the bulwarks permitting water to drain off the deck.
- Shackle: a U-shaped fitting secured by a removable pin for securely connecting chains, lines, and other fittings. Known as a "snap shackle" when fitted with a spring-loaded pin.
- Sheave box: a plastic or stainless steel box that holds a pulley that is fixed in position as on a mast head.
- Sheer: the generally curved shape of the upper hull. It is traditionally lowest amidships to maximize freeboard at the ends of the hull. Sheer can be reverse, higher in the middle to maximize space inside, or straight or a combination of shapes.
- Sheet: a line which controls the clew of a sail.
- Skeg: a vertical blade beneath the hull, typically to support and protect the rudder and to promote the rudder's efficiency by preventing "stalling".
- Spar: a length of timber, aluminium, steel or carbon fibre of approximately round or pear shaped cross-section which supports a sail or sails. Spars include the mast, boom, gaff, yard, bowsprit, prod, boomkin, pole and dolphin striker.
- Sole: the floor of a cabin or cockpit.
- Spinnaker (or "kite"): a large, lightweight, down-wind sail used on fore and aft rigged yachts such as sloops to dramatically increase sail area typically used running with the wind.
- Spring: the amount of fore and aft curvature in the keel.
- Stanchions: a post for holding life lines on a deck.
- Stainless steel: a corrosion-resistant alloy of mild steel and small percentages of such metals as copper, chromium, molybdenum, and nickel. Common alloys are "18/8" (known as "surgical stainless steel") and "316" ("marine grade"), which contains more salt-water resistant nickel.
- Stays/shrouds: standing or running rigging which holds a spar in position (e.g. forestay, backstay, bobstay). Formerly made of rope, typically of braided stainless steel wire, occasionally solid metal rod.
- Stem: a continuation of the keel upwards at the bow where the two sides of the hull meet.
- Stern: the aftmost part of a boat, often ending in a transom.
- Stern sheets a flat area or deck, inboard of the transom in a small boat. It may contain hatches to access below decks or provide storage on deck for life saving equipment.
- Strake: planking, running from the "garboard" strake affixed to the keel to the "sheer" strake below the caprail.
- Stringer (also "batten"): a long relatively thin, knot free length of wood, running fore and aft, often used to reinforce planking on the inside of the hull.
- Synthetic rope: lines manufactured from chained chemicals. The four most common are: polyester (including brand names Dacron and Terylene), a strong, low stretch line, usually plaited (braided) used for running rigging; nylon, a strong but elastic line resistant to shock loads, best suited for mooring lines and anchor warps. It is usually laid (twisted) so to make it easier to grip when hauling; polypropylene, a light, cheap, slippery, buoyant line, typically laid, which is by far the weakest of the four, and deteriorates when exposed to sunlight. Commonly used on commercial fishing boats using nets; and Kevlar, an extremely strong and expensive fibre with almost no stretch, usually braided and best suited for halyards.
- Taff rail: a railing at the extreme stern of a vessel.
- Thwart: a transverse member used to maintain the shape of the topsides of a small boat, often doubling as a seat.
- Tiller: a forward-facing attached to the rudder allowing a helmsman to steer a boat. On a dinghy, the tiller may have a hinged extension called a "jigger".
- Toe rail: an upright longitudinal strip of wood surrounding a deck near the sheer, especially forward, for safety and to provide purchase when a boat is heeled.
- Topping lift: a line running from a cleat on the mast through a block at the masthead and down to the aft end of a boom for supporting the boom when not in use or when reefing.
- Topsides: the side planking of a boat from the waterline to the sheerstrake.
- Transom: a vertical part of the hull at the stern. Transoms provide width and additional buoyancy at the stern. Dinghies may attach an outboard motor to the transom.
- Warp: anchor line, traditionally made of stiff natural fibre such as hemp, today of stronger, lighter, synthetic fibres such as laid nylon, prized for its elasticity in absorbing shock loads on an anchor.
- Winch: a geared device providing both friction and mechanical advantage in sail trimming, hoisting large sails, and retrieving an anchor. Some winches are self-tailing, allowing efficient one-man usage, others electrically powered.
- Wind pennant: a small pivoting masthead wind indicator.
- Yard: a horizontal spar on a square rigged ship fitted to the forward side of a mast, holding a square sail forward of the shrouds. An extension to the yard is the "yard-arm".

== Gallery ==
Traditional wooden boat building in Vietnam

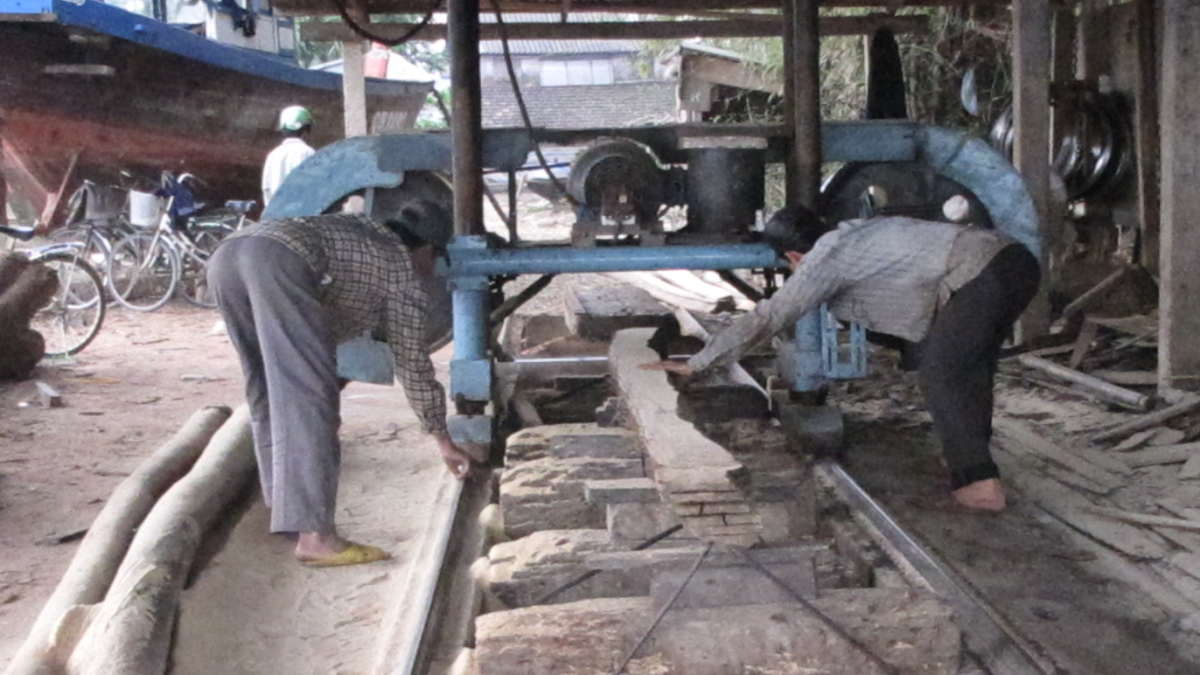
Small boatyard horizontal band saw, Hội An

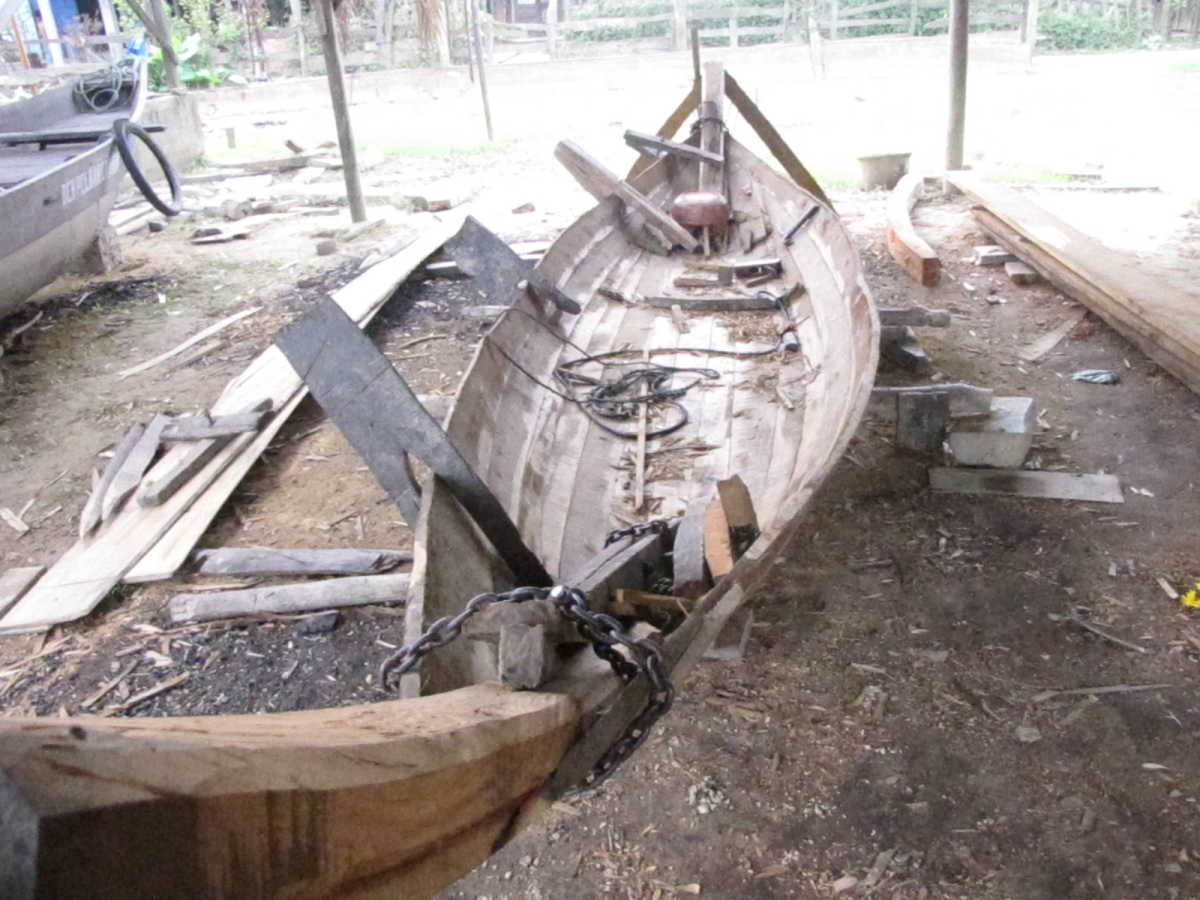
Small boat using the planks first method, Hội An

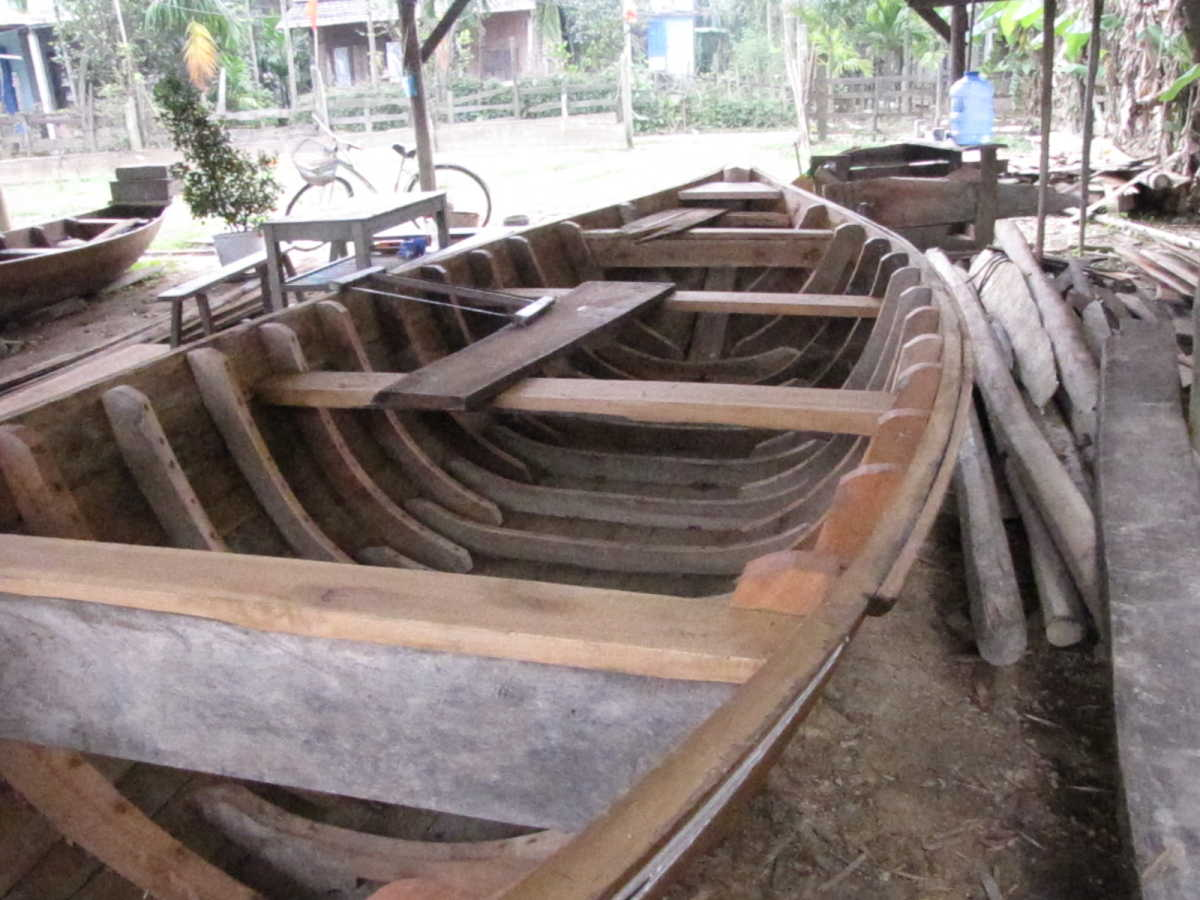
Boat nearing completion with frames added, Hội An

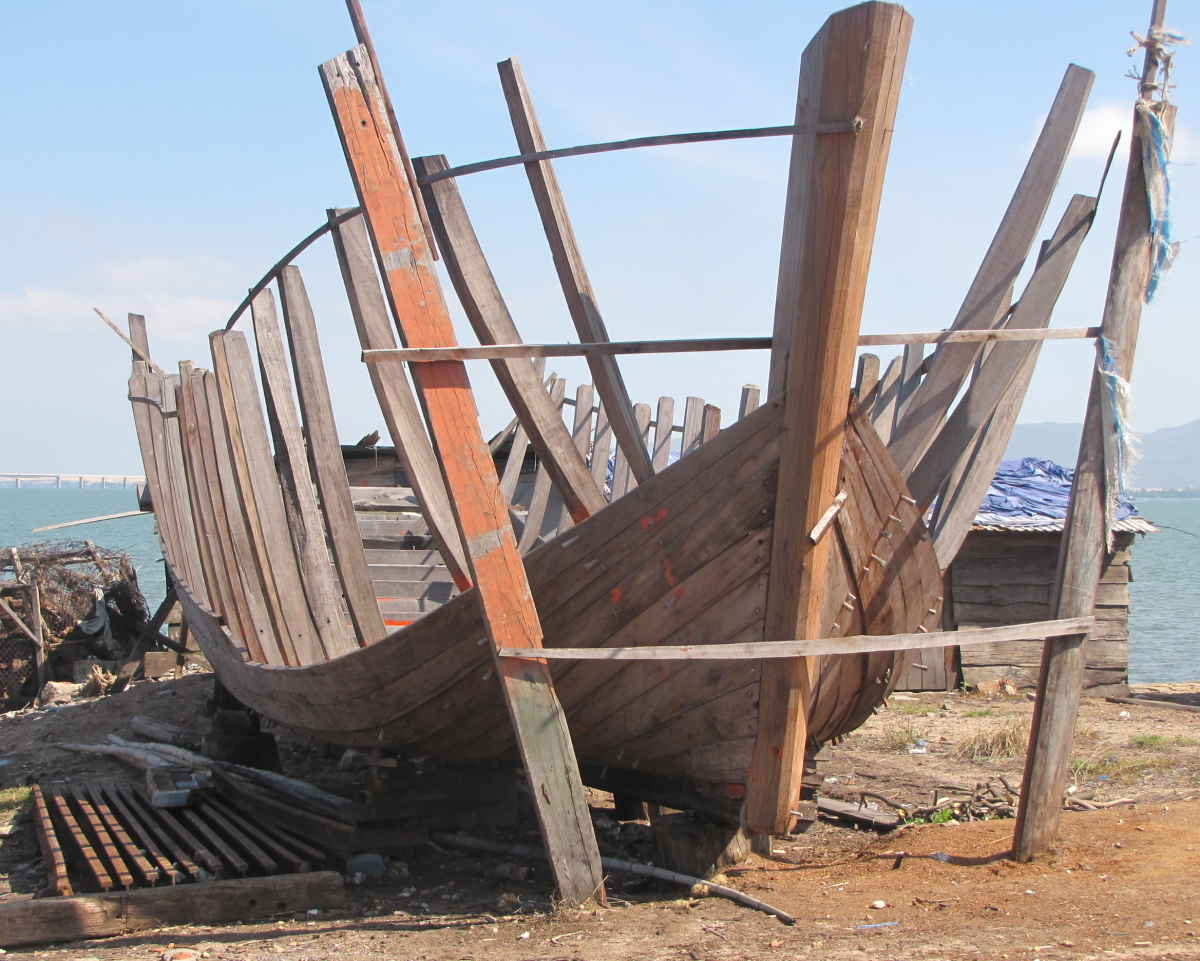
Plank on frame construction, Quy Nhơn

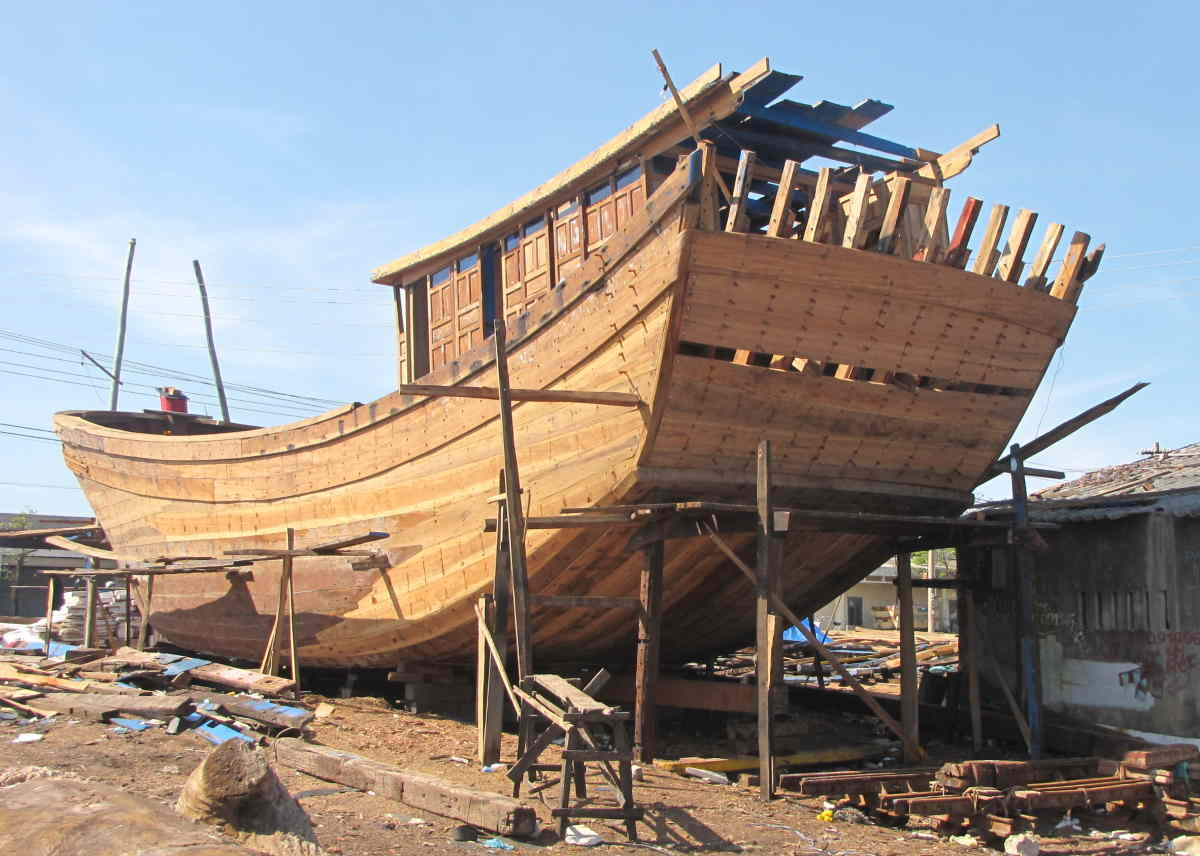
Almost completed offshore fishing hull, Quy Nhơn

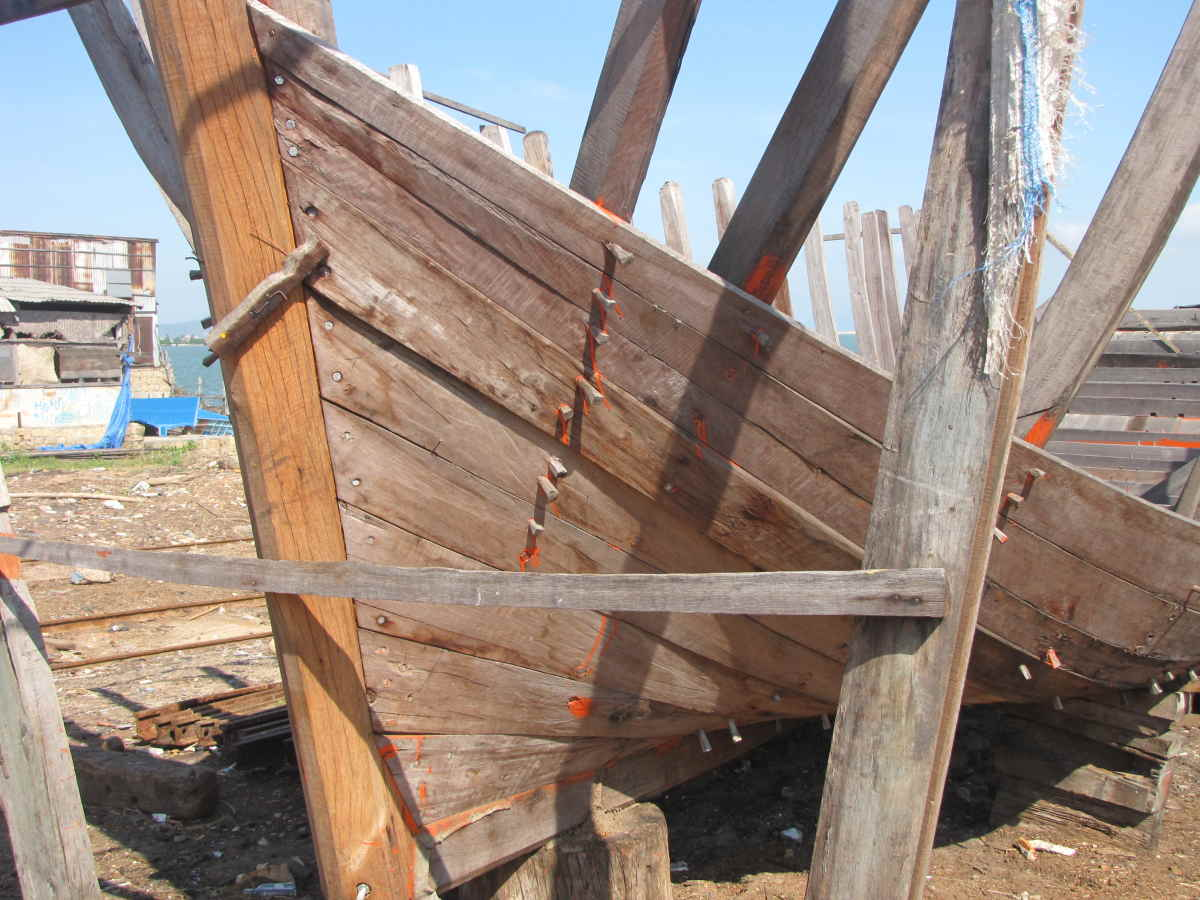
Plank fixing, trenails and red lead paint, Quy Nhơn

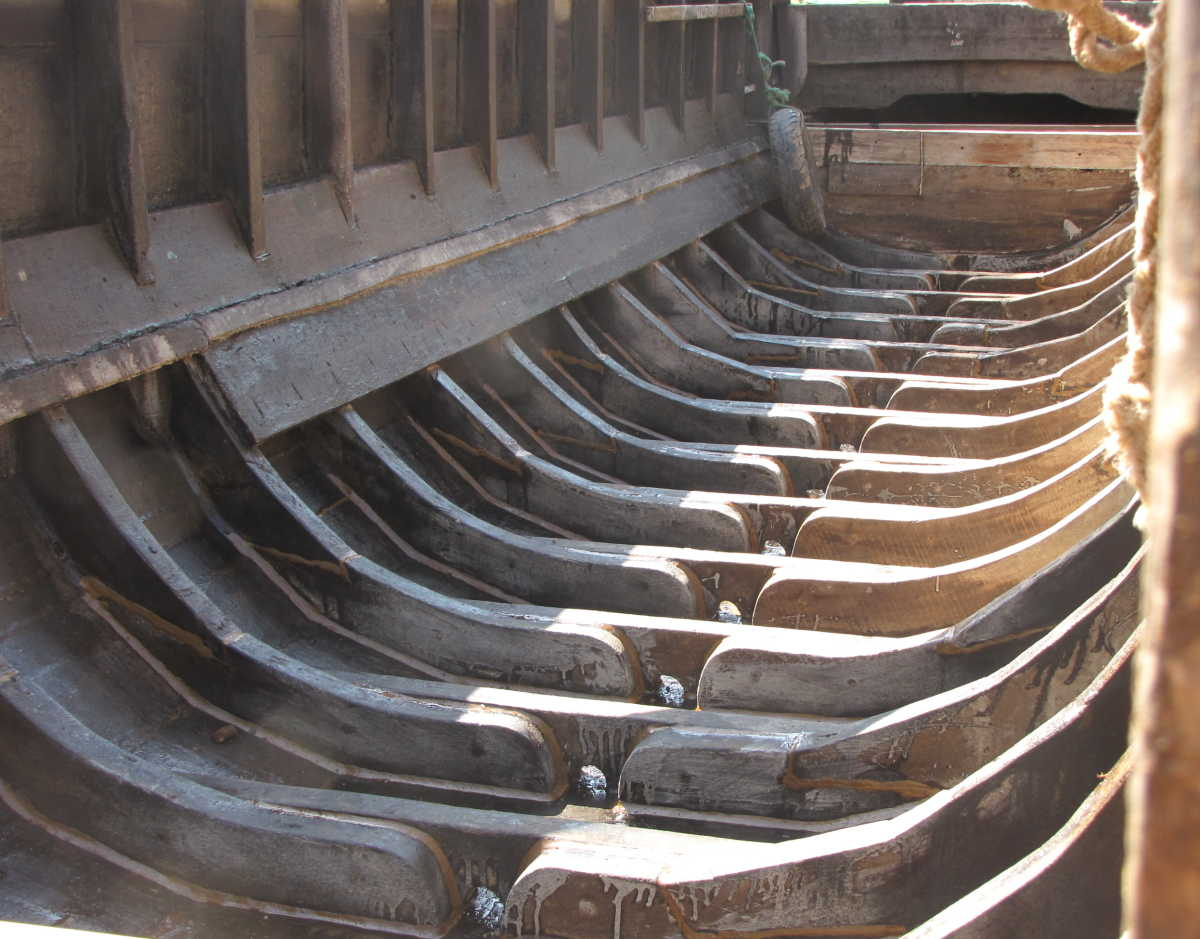
Repaired frames, barge hull, Sa Đéc, Mekong Delta

== Safety standards and regulations ==
Modern boat building must comply with various ISO standards for safety and construction quality. Key standards include ISO 15085:2024 for man-overboard prevention systems, ISO 12217-1:2022 for stability assessment, and EN ISO 6185-3:2024 for inflatable boats.

ISO 12215-5:2019 provides guidelines for hull structural design, while ISO 21487:2022 covers permanently installed fuel tank requirements.

Regional regulations such as the Recreational Craft Directive 2013/53/EU govern design categories and safety requirements for recreational vessels in Europe.

== See also ==
- Ancient shipbuilding techniques
- Boat building tools
- Center for Wooden Boats
- Lofting
- Marine propulsion
- Sail-plan
- Shipbuilding
