= Seth Thomas Clock Company =

American clock company

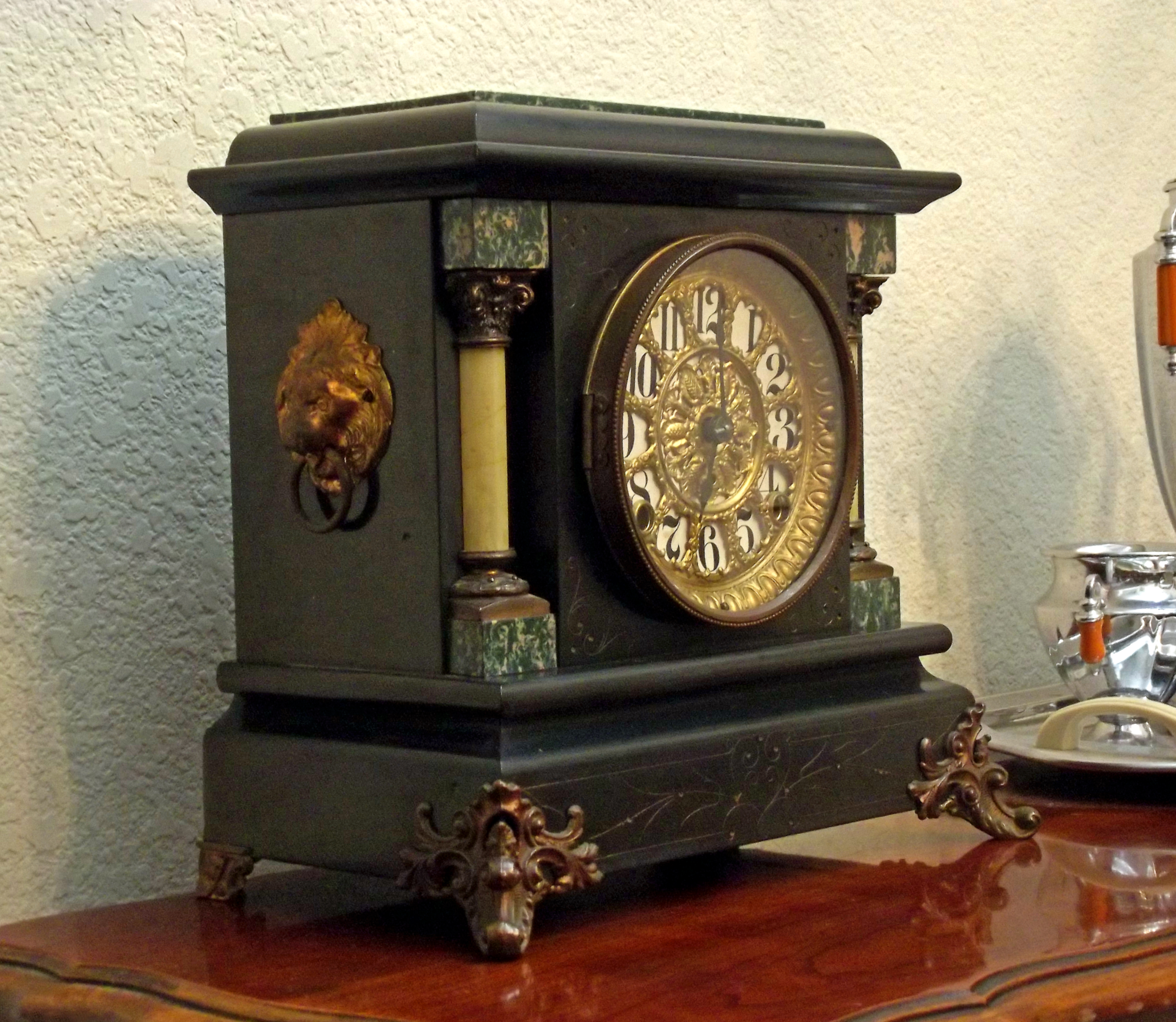
Mantel clock from 1880, manufactured by the Seth Thomas Clock Company

The Seth Thomas Clock Company was founded by Seth Thomas in Plymouth Hollow, Connecticut, and began producing clocks in 1813. It was incorporated as the "Seth Thomas Clock Company" in 1853. Plymouth Hollow, a part of the town of Plymouth, was incorporated in 1875 as the town of Thomaston, named for Seth Thomas. The company manufactured clock movements for the Self Winding Clock Company from 1886 thru the early 1890s, in addition to its standard offering of longcase clocks, mantel, wall, and table-top clocks.

On May 7, 1926, Seth Thomas Clock Company filed with the United States Patent and Trademark Office for trademark protection of the Seth Thomas brand with regard to clocks. The trademark was granted with a registration date of October 12, 1926 and assigned registration number 0219268. The trademark is still active as of the last renewal date of February 17, 2017.

In 1968 General Time Corporation, consisting of the Westclox and Seth Thomas brands and the Westclox operation in Canada, was acquired by Talley Industries. Westclox Canada was the only company that came close to matching the production of Canada's leading clock company, The Arthur Pequegnat Clock Company.

Seth Thomas Clock Company was later owned by the Colibri Group. The company ceased operations on January 16, 2009, and went into receivership, but returned to business as of May 4, 2009, under the ownership of CST Enterprises in Cranston, Rhode Island. No manufacturing is underway; however an entire line of Seth Thomas Clocks is now available made by another clock builder for CST under the Seth Thomas brand.

== Gallery ==
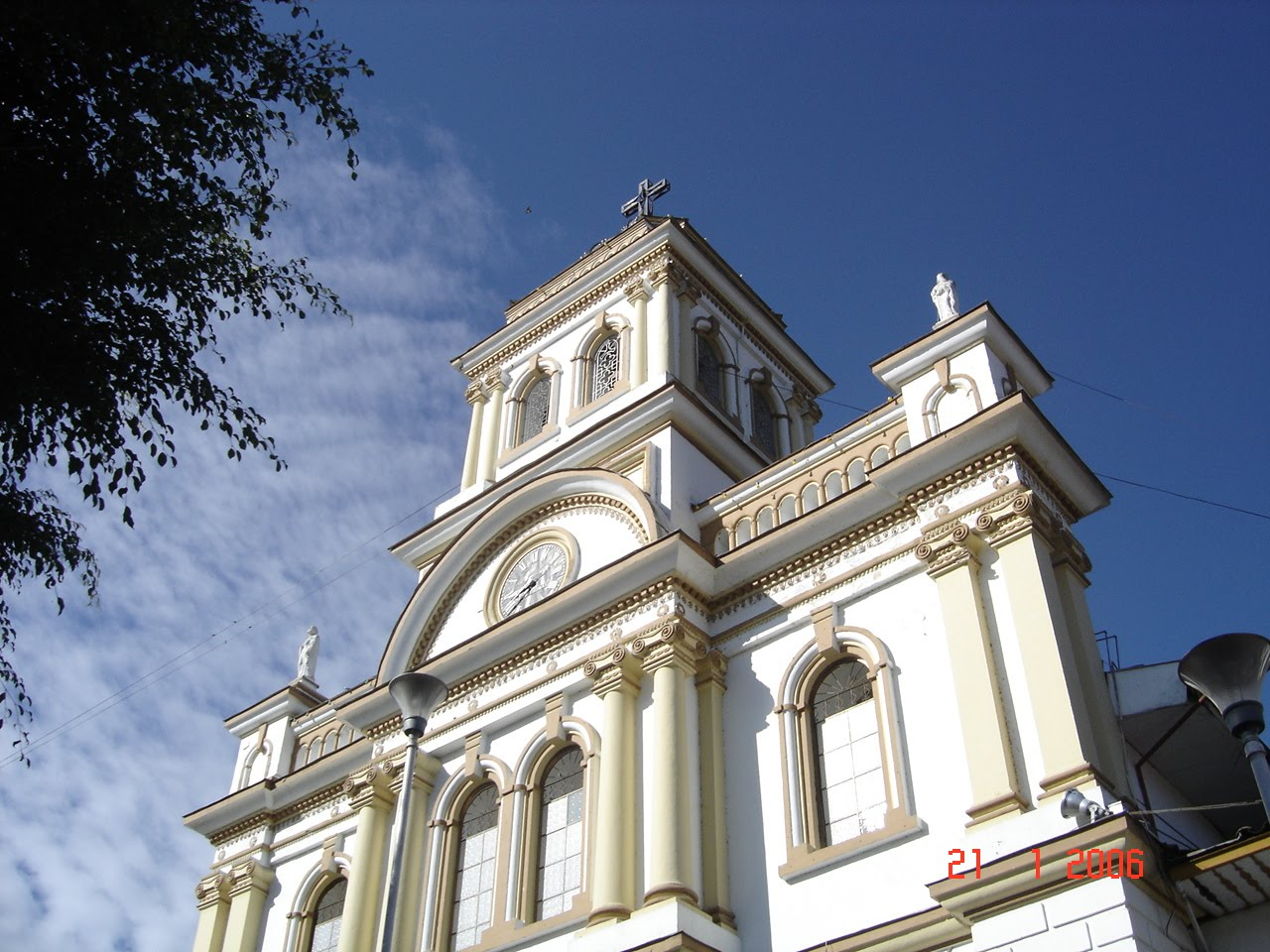
Front of Neira Caldas with clock of Seth Thomas Clock Company.

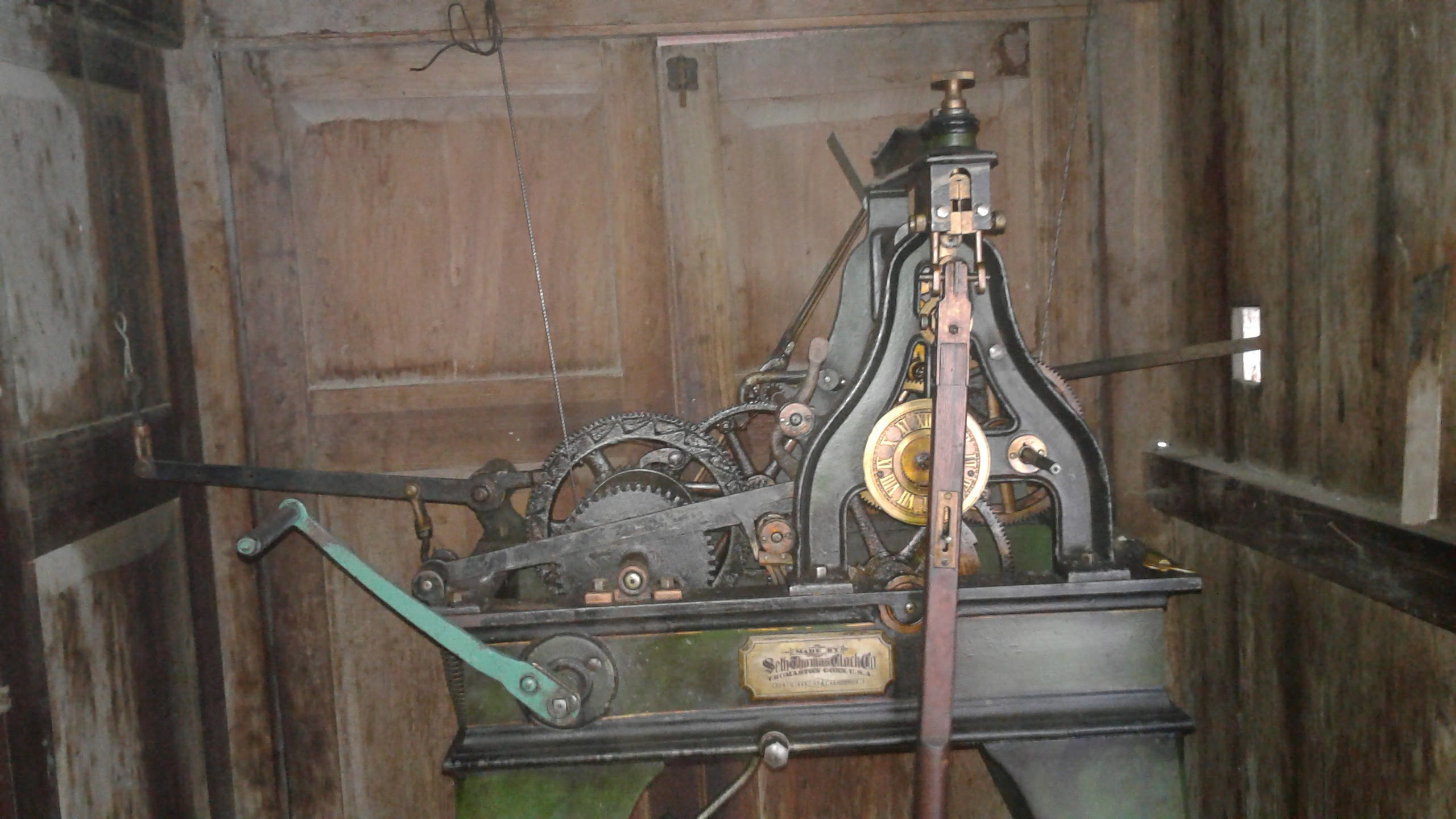
Clock movement at the San Juan Bautista in Neira-Caldas, Colombia.

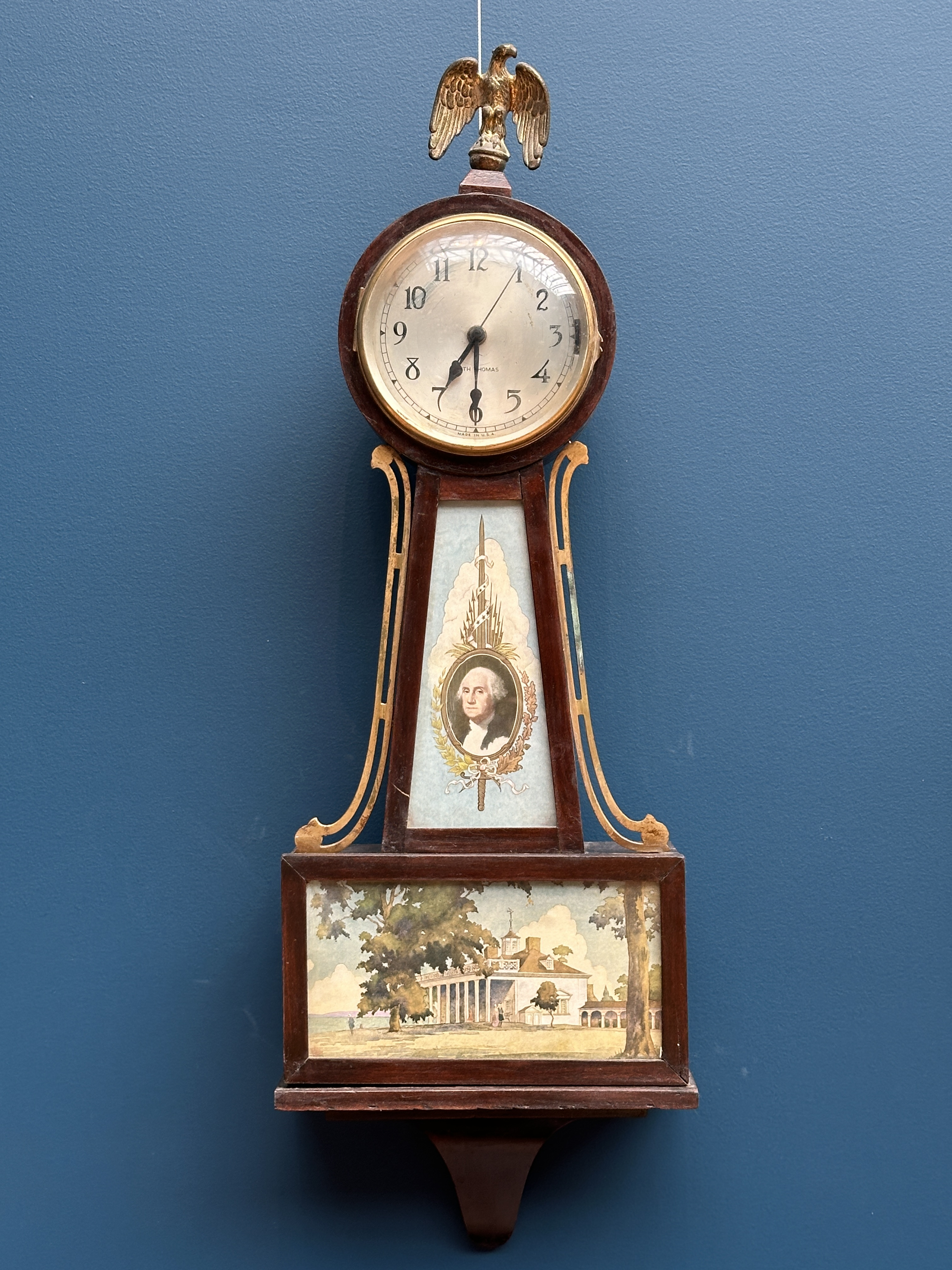
1910 clock, Washington County Museum of Fine Arts

== Presidents ==
- Seth Thomas (clockmaker) 1853(?) to 1859.
- Seth Thomas, Jr. 1915 to 1932.
