= Kolibri =

Kolibri, meaning hummingbird, may refer to:

== Technology and engineering ==
- Kolibri Games, a German gaming company
- 2mm Kolibri, a pistol
- Borgward Kolibri, a.k.a. Borgward-Focke BFK-1 Kolibri, a German three-seated utility helicopter built by Borgward
- Flettner Fl 282 Kolibri, a German single seat helicopter from World War II
- KolibriOS, a computer operating system
- Zeiss Ikon Kolibri, Kolibri 523/18 was a camera made by Zeiss Ikon between 1930 and 1935
- An experimental storage battery in the Audi A2 vehicle
- A Soviet torpedo

== Other ==
- Kolibri (band), a Russian musical group
- Kolibri (keelboat), a Dutch cabin sailing boat designed in 1963
- Kolibri (video game), a video game for the Sega 32X
- Kolibri Choir, a children's choir
- Night of the Long Knives, a Nazi Germany purge, by code word
- The code name for the character Martin Rauch in the television series Deutschland 83 and sequels

== See also ==
- Colibri (disambiguation)
- Kolibree, French toothbrush company
