= Boat building tools =

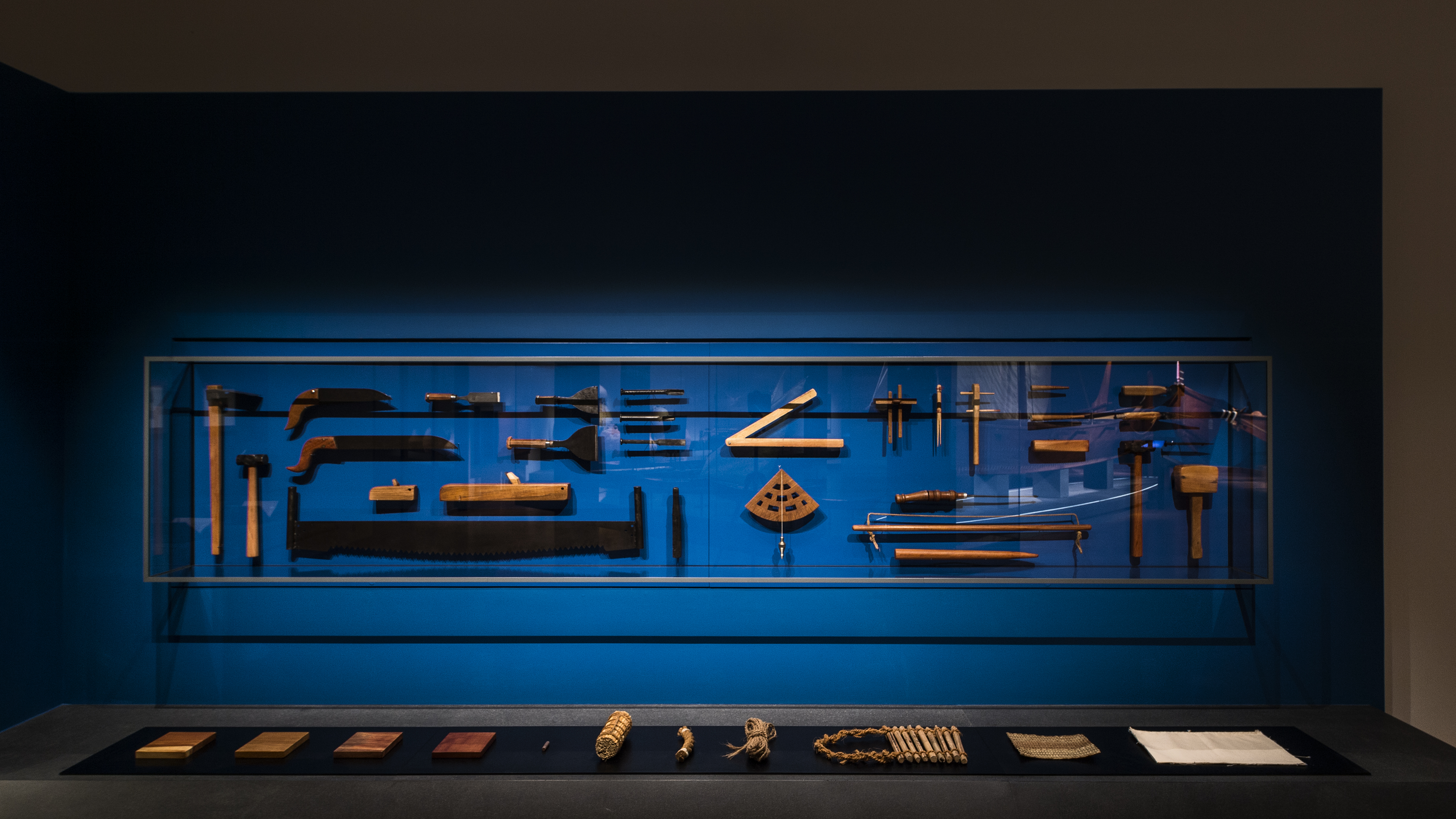
Ship Making tools, SaraMuseum

Boat building uses many common house tools such as a hammers, crosscut saws, power drills, benches and vises.

== List of Common Tools ==
Common tools are clamps (cramps), surform rasps, drills, rotary sanding backing pads, sanding pads, counter sinking drills, right angle set squares, manual screw drivers, heavy craft knives, tape, flat and round files for metal and wood, and chisels. Power tools include circular saws, jigsaws, rotary oscillating sanders, cordless drills, and steam boxes. Hacksaws, tenon saws, Japanese draw saws, and smoothing planes are also used sometimes. Other useful power tools are belt sanders, planers, and bench saws.

Fasteners include silicon bronze screws, brass fasteners, stainless steel screws, sacrificial anodes, epoxy resins, and hardeners. Wooden tongue depressors, silicon bronze ring nails, copper wire, nylon fishing lines, plastic cable ties, and polyester filler are also common.

Water-based paint, enamel, and varnish are common for coating.

Essential safety gear and settings include closed-in footwear, ear protectors, eye shields, disposable gloves, close-fitting clothes that will not get caught in drills, respiratory protection masks, dust extraction equipment, cleaning workshops, lighting, and ventilation.
