= Steam box =

Woodworking tool

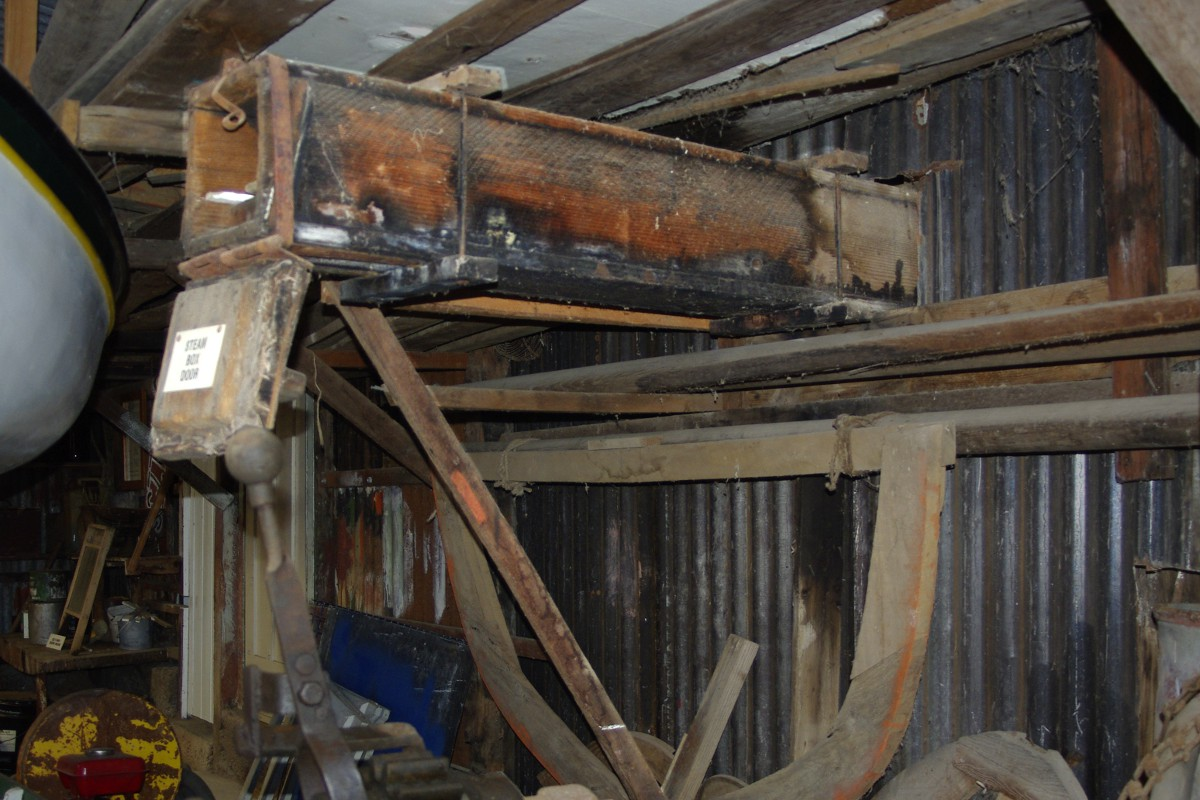
Steam box formerly used in shipbuilding at historic Axel Stenross slipway, Port Lincoln, South Australia

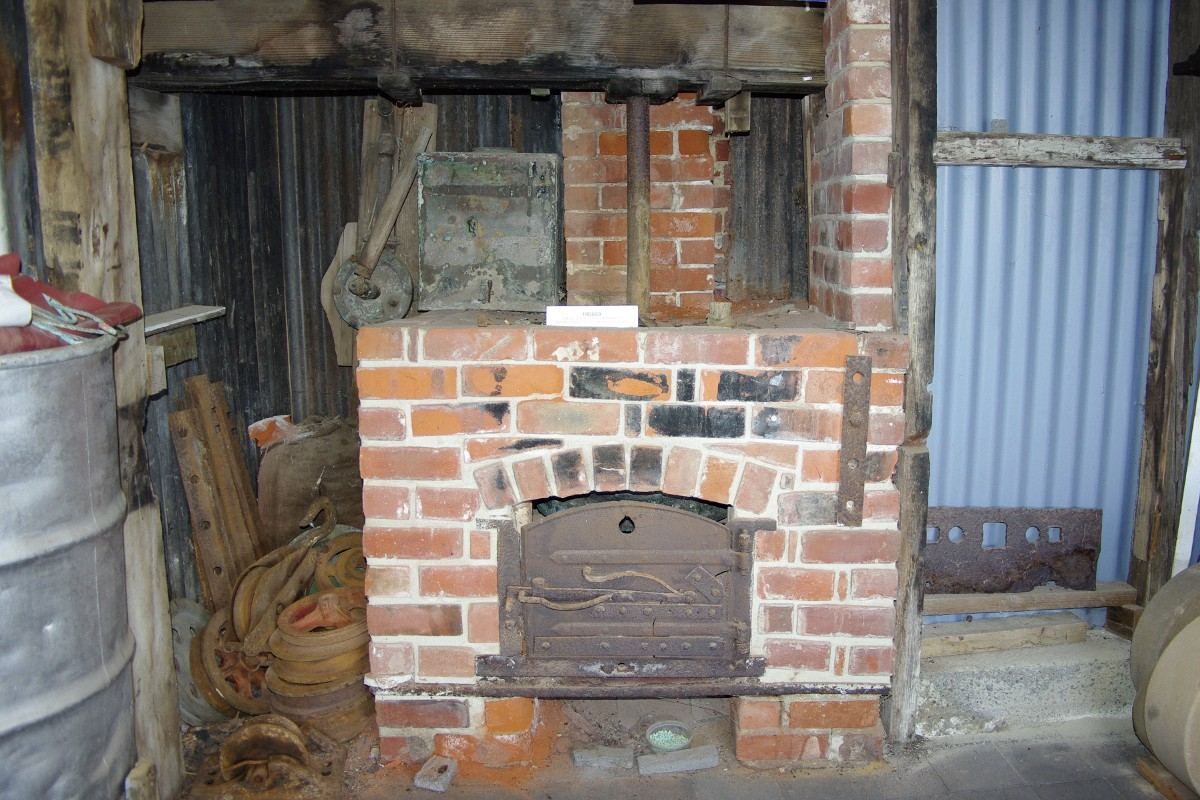
Steam box oven at historic Axel Stenross slipway, Port Lincoln, South Australia

A steam box is a long, sealed container used to steam wooden planks for the purpose of making them pliable. Once steamed and then fastened or clamped into the desired position and left to dry, the wood will hold the new shape. Steam boxes allow for much more efficient use of wood. Instead of cutting the desired shape away from a large and more expensive piece of wood and leaving much scrap to be discarded, steam boxes allow for a smaller piece to be bent in the general shape and leaving much less scrap. Steam boxes also allow the wood to bend beyond its dry breaking point, which is useful in making extreme curves with the wood. In many cases, the bent piece is stronger than an identical piece cut from larger stock. Steam bending wood allows the wood grain to follow the bend, leaving it strong where a piece cut from larger stock would snap across crosscut grains or laminated joints.

The largest steam boxes are used in boat building to bend the large planks for the frame and hull. However, smaller ones are used in making a variety of consumer items, such as rocking chairs, musical instruments and walking canes.

== See also ==
- Steam bending
