= Tolman Skiff =

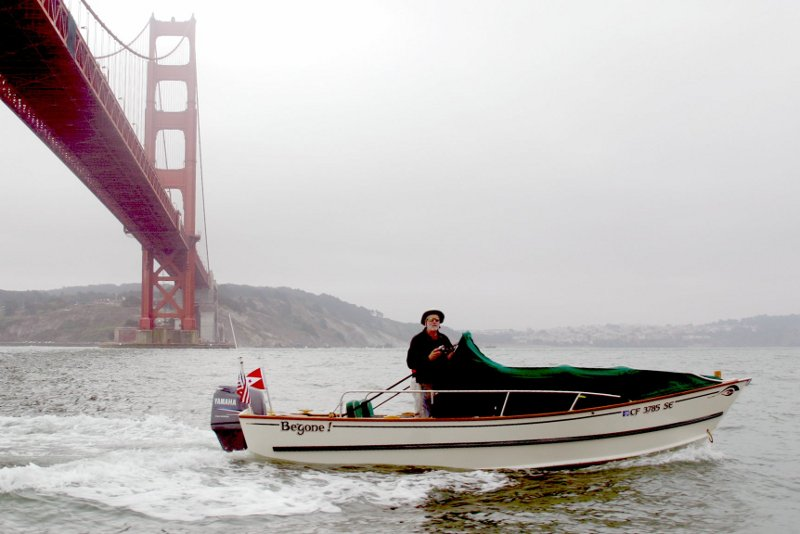
Tolman Standard Skiff under Golden Gate Bridge, California

The Tolman Skiff is a boat design of Dory heritage created by Renn Tolman of Homer, Alaska. Tolman authored two books, initially, "A Skiff For All Seasons", in 1992 and a revised version "Tolman Alaskan Skiffs", in 2003. The books described advantages of the design and construction method Stitch and glue using plywood, fiberglass cloth, and epoxy. Included in the books were drawings and designs for simple skiffs suitable for backyard, do-it-yourself construction.

Tolman Skiffs were designed as a basic platform suitable for the builder to modify for specific purposes such as camping, cruising, fishing or pleasure.

The Tolman skiff utilizes a design that planes readily with minimal power requirements, and has a large reserve capacity due to the hull shape, as further depression of the hull into the water increases buoyancy.

Many of these boats have been built and used around the world, garnering a reputation for being economical, seaworthy, and durable.

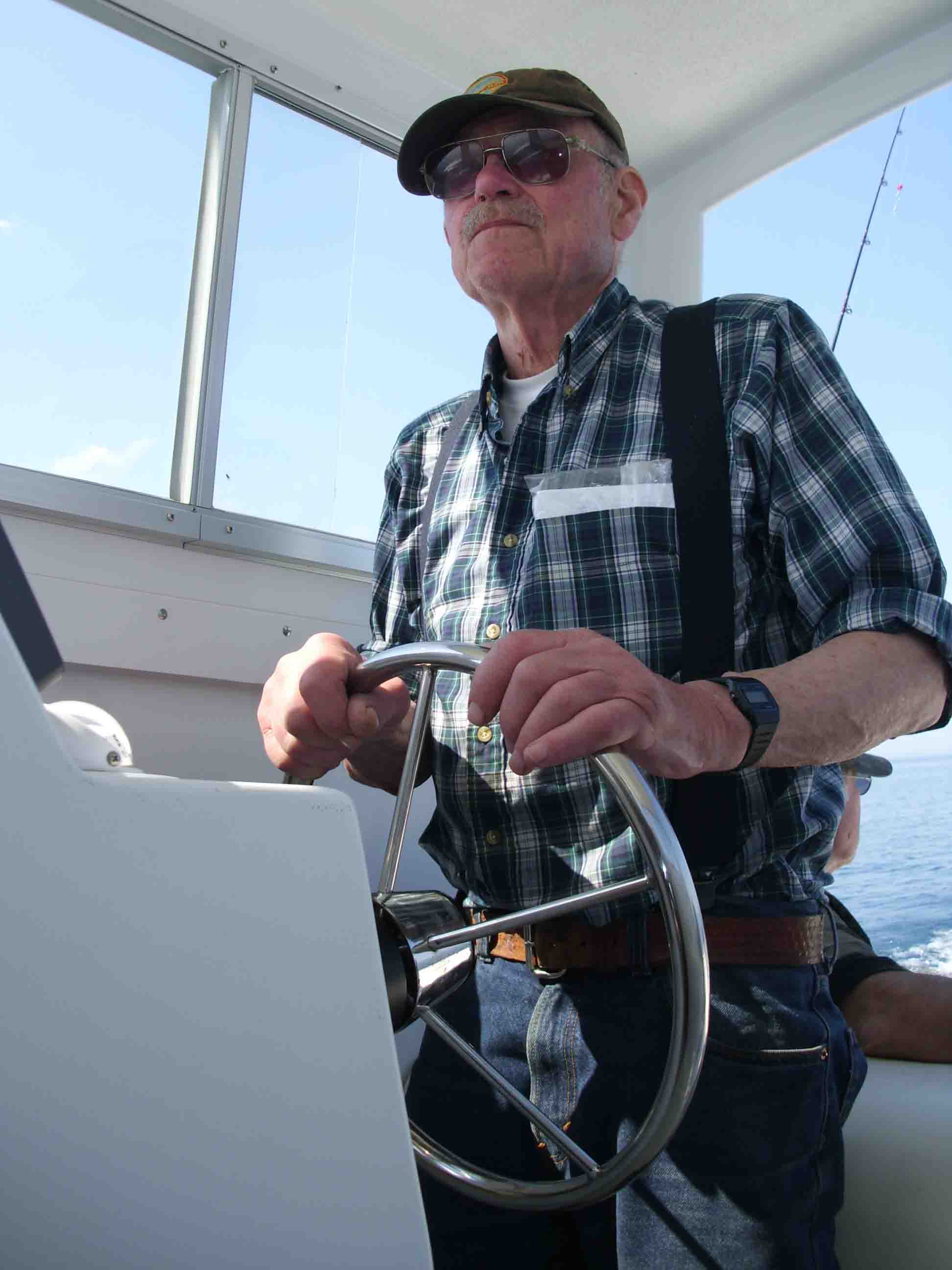
Renn Tolman on Lake Michigan March 2012

In addition to the designs described in the book, precision cut kits and detailed, full sized plans are commercially available. Tolman skiffs are light compared to fiberglass or aluminum boats of similar size and strength. Renn Tolman developed three different design versions of the Tolman Skiff, ranging in size from 18 to 24 feet.

Designs include:

- Standard: Semi-Vee design constructed from marine plywood and epoxy/fiberglass cloth.
- Widebody: Similar to the standard, but longer and wider, with 3" wide chine flats on each side of the bottom.
- Jumbo: Longer and deeper than the Widebody, with 4" chine flats on each side of the bottom.

Many builders modify the basic design of the boat to suit their needs. Although not documented in the original design, some builders are known to have stretched both the Widebody and Jumbo to at least 27 feet. Many builders have voyaged far in their Tolman Skiffs. Friedhelm Würfel of Hamburg, Germany documented his 2009 tour of the Gulf of Bothnia in his book.

Renn Tolman passed on July 5, 2014.

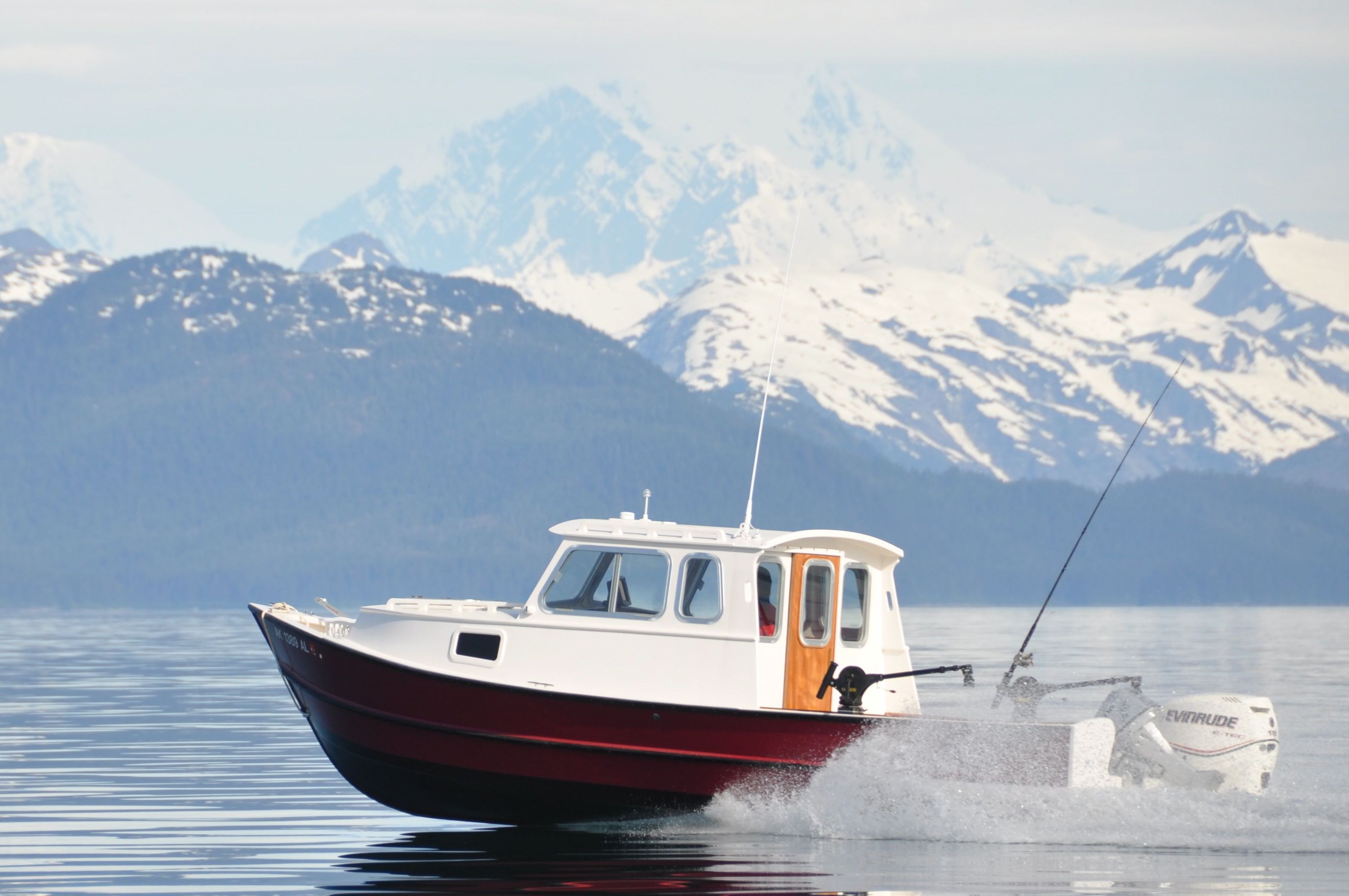
Schlechter Tolman Widebody

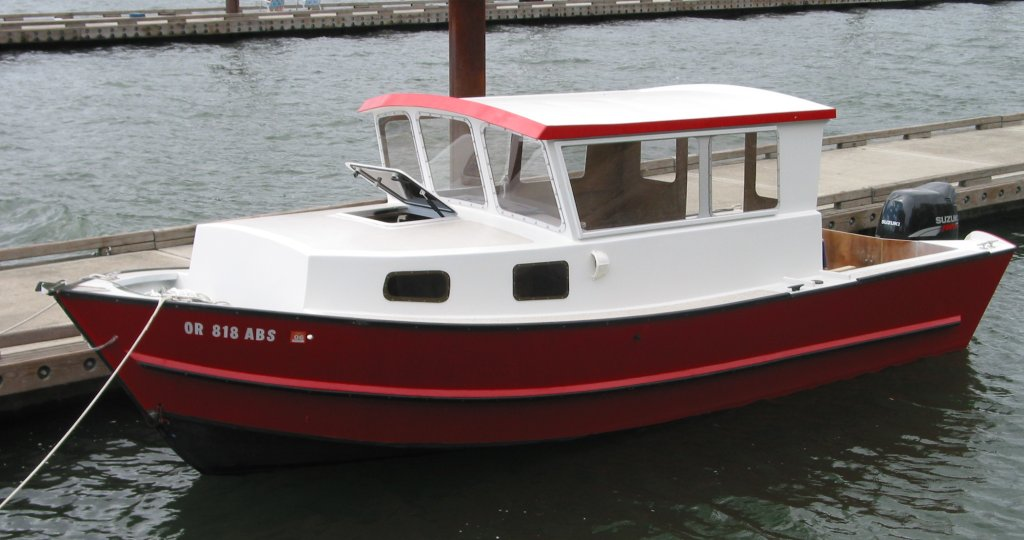
Nelson Tolman Jumbo Skiff

Fithian Modified Tolman Jumbo

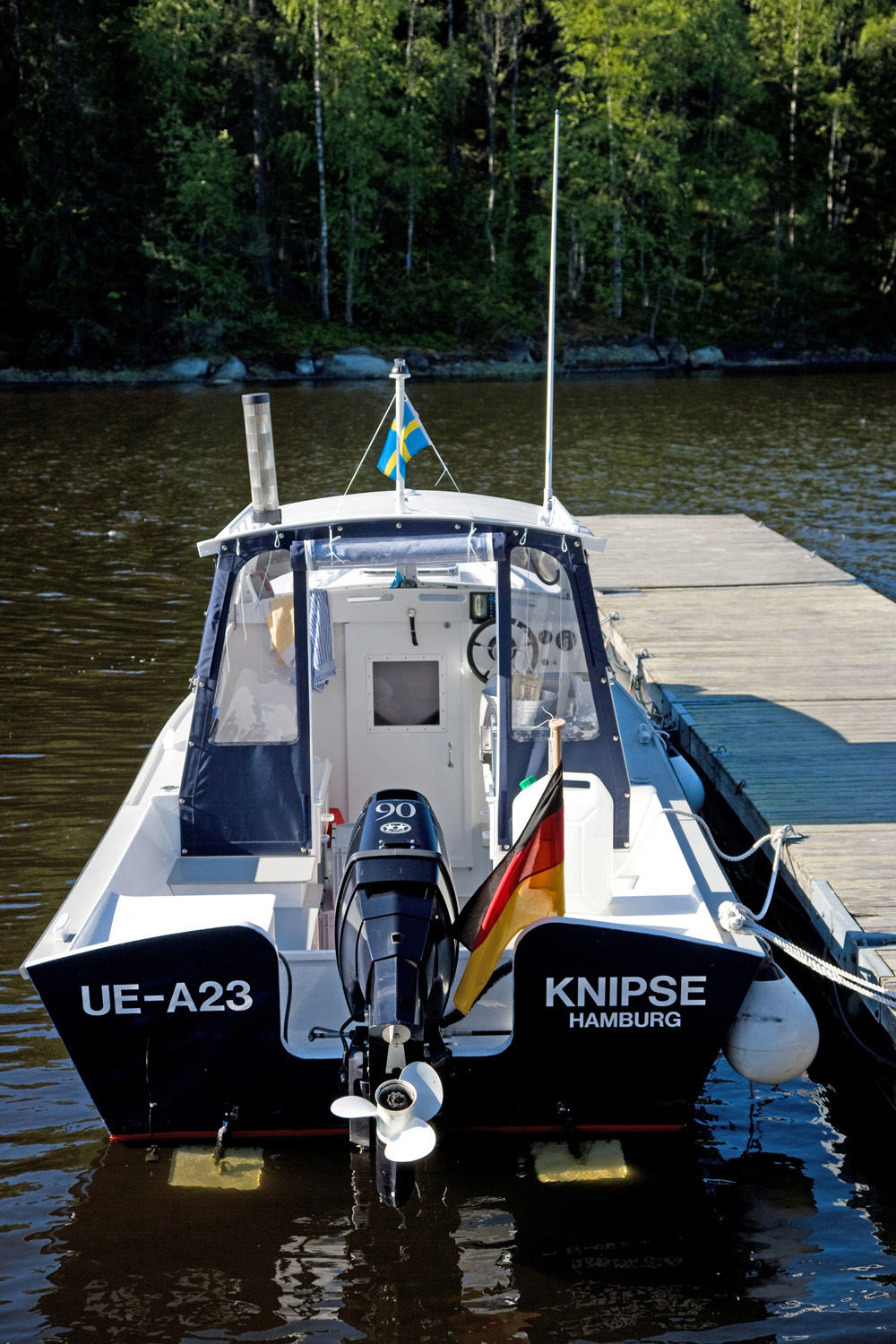
Würfel Widebody Skiff, Hamburg, Germany
