= IMA Colibri =

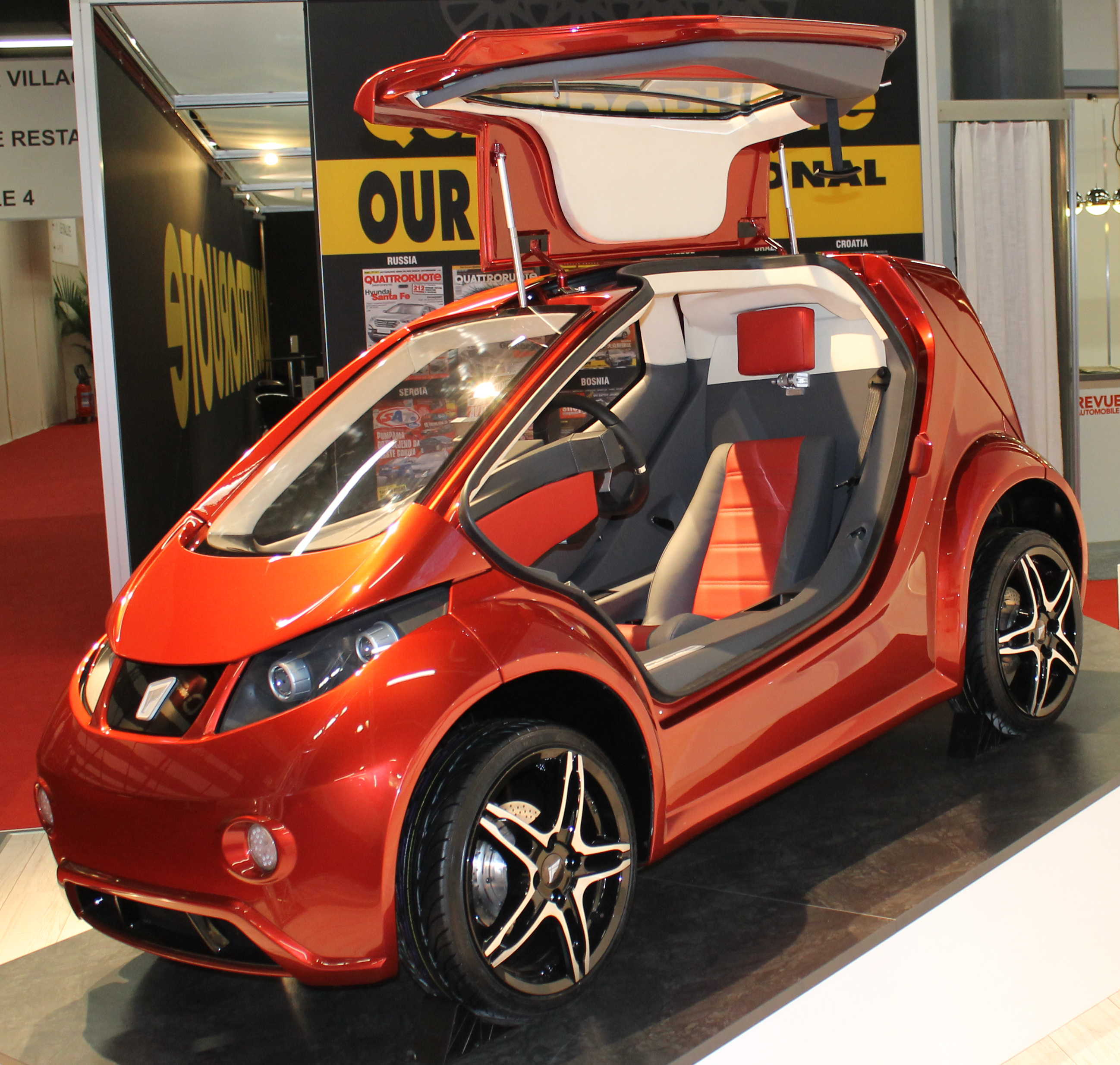
- The electric one-seater "Colibri" from Jena, Germany, as it was presented at the Geneva Motor Show in 2013

Overview
- Manufacturer: Innovative Mobility Automobile GmbH
- Production: from 2014

Body and chassis
- Class: European L7e / Microcar
- Body style: 3-door hatchback
- Layout: Rear-engine, rear-wheel drive layout

Powertrain
- Electric motor: 24 kW (32 hp), 60 N⋅m (40 ft⋅lb) synchronous motor
- Transmission: two gear automatic transmission
- Battery: 6.5 kW•h lithium iron phosphate battery
- Range: 110.00 km (68.35 mi)

Dimensions
- Length: 2,750 mm (108.3 in)
- Width: 1,180 mm (46.5 in)
- Height: 1,300 mm (51.2 in)
- Curb weight: 440 kg (970 lb)

The 'Colibri' is a one-person light electric vehicle developed by Innovative Mobility Automobile in Jena, Germany.

== Vehicle concept ==
The Colibri's development stems from three general facts of current mobility behavior: the majority of people use individual transportation and on average cars are occupied by less than two people and travel daily distances of less than 55 kilometers (34 miles).

Distinct features of the Colibri are the frame made of magnesium, which is considerably lighter than comparable construction types, and an electrically powered seat which is designed to increase the driver's comfort when entering or exiting the vehicle. Five other industrial companies and a university are involved in the development. R & D is subsidized by the German Federal Ministry of Education and Research. In 2012 the prototype was being built, while serial production was scheduled to start in 2014.

== 2013 World Premiere in Geneva ==
After successful completion of the prototype phase, the vehicle had its world premiere at the 2013 Geneva Motor Show.

== Body ==
According to the manufacturer, it will be the first vehicle in its class (L7e) to successfully pass the Euro NCAP crash test – despite the low curb weight of 440 kg (970 lbs) including the battery. With the comparatively low-capacity battery holding 6.5 kWhrs of electric energy, ranges of up to 110 kilometers (68 miles) per charge can be achieved, as well as short recharging time of two hours on a 220 V household socket or less than twenty minutes to 80% capacity on a fast charging station. In addition, the Colibri will offer a fully enclosed cab and hence be weatherproof, unlike its already available competitor, the Renault Twizy. The trunk will offer 180 liters (6.35 ft³) of cargo volume.

Industry experts predict a significant market share potential for the Colibri; internationally, the vehicle is drawing some attention as well.

== Performance ==
Due to its low weight, the vehicle is expected to achieve a maximum speed of up to 74 mph (120 km/h) and accelerate to 60 mph (100 km/h) in under 10 seconds. In contrast to comparable vehicles like the Renault Twizy, the Colibri will utilize a two-gear automatic transmission to reduce energy consumption at higher speeds.

== Costs ==
The planned list price is set at €8,900 for the base version, including VAT but excluding the monthly lease rate for the lithium iron phosphate battery of €55 . Assuming an electricity price of €0.20 per kWh, total costs per kilometer driven would be €0.17, including vehicle depreciation, battery lease, maintenance, taxes, insurance and energy. Compared to the most cost-efficient city car which, according to the German ADAC, costs around €0.30, a light elective vehicle like the Colibri saves €0.13 / km. A compact car easily exceeds €0.40 / km.
