= HMS Colibri =

Only one vessel of the Royal Navy has borne the name HMS Colibri, after the Colibri, a genus of hummingbird. There was to be a second vessel of the same name but she was never completed. The two vessels were:

- HMS Colibri (1809), a French brig-sloop launched in 1808 that the British captured in 1809 and took into the Royal Navy; she wrecked at Port Royal Sound, South Carolina in 1813.
- In December 1814 the Admiralty proposed the building of prefabricated frames for two brig-sloops, to be named Colibri and Goshawk. The frames were built in January of the next year and then shipped to Halifax, Nova Scotia in March. In July the Admiralty ordered that if it was not practicable to construct the vessels on the Great Lakes that the vessels should be completed at Halifax. The order was never carried out and in May 1815 the Admiralty countermanded the order, instead ordering the frames sold.
