= Kolibri (keelboat) =

The kolibri 560 is a Dutch cabin sailing boat designed in 1963 by G.A. Pfeiffer and built by Antoon van den Brink and his sons.

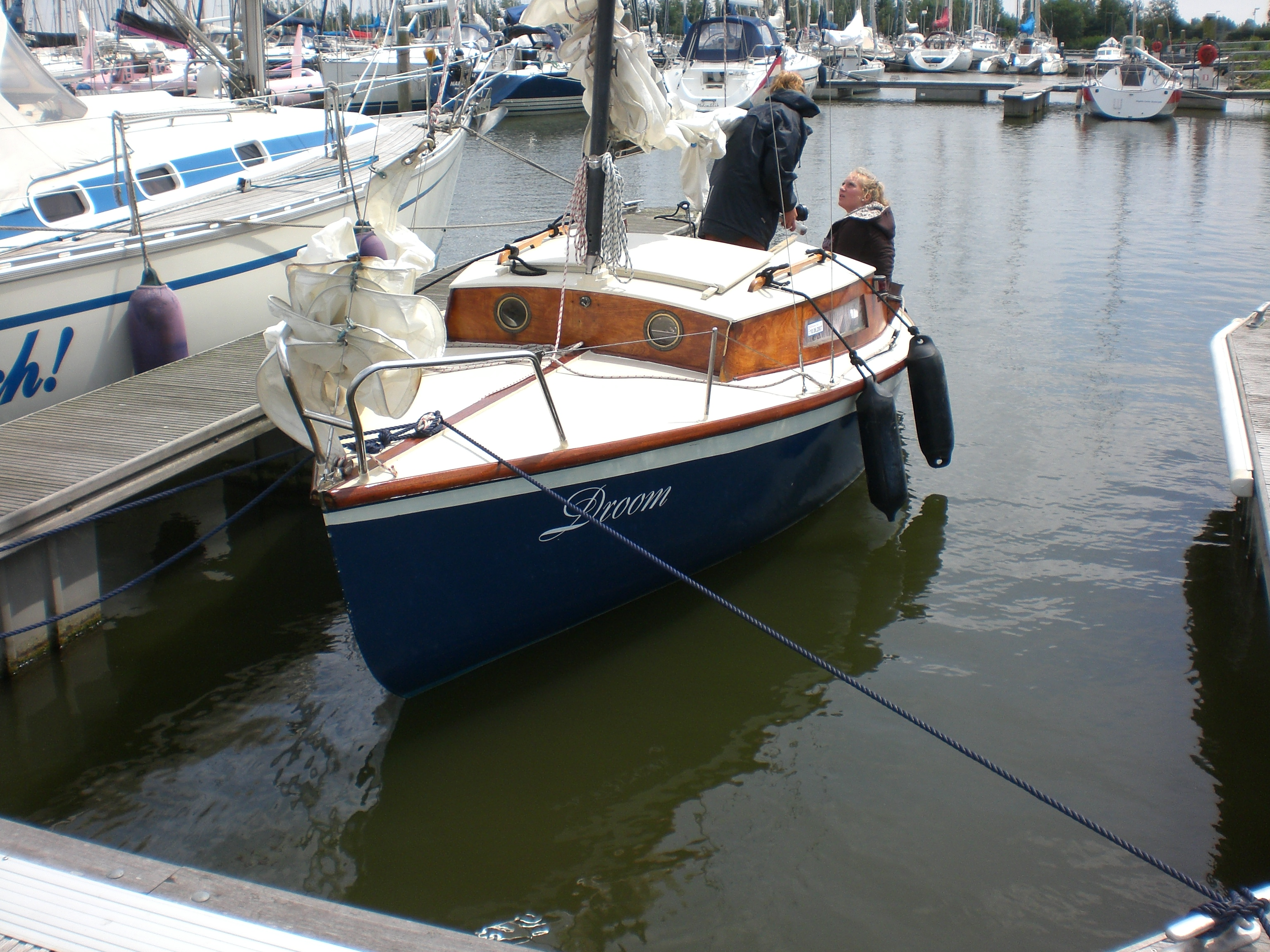
Kolibri

The boats were a great success because they were sold as a self building package which made them affordable for a lot of people. The building packages were sold until the early 1980s and delivery periods of one year were the norm. The kolibri 560 is a 5.60 m long, 2.00 m wide with a depth of 1.00 m, sailing boat which is unsinkable, has a self draining tub and is sea worthy. Four people can sleep in this boat and it was presented at the HISWA exposition (a Dutch boat exposition) in 1964. Over a thousand were sold. In 2007 a polyester version was developed and was nicknamed Polybri.

== Features ==
The kolibri 560 has a wide cabin and an interior that was designed while using it, which has made it an optimal design. This boat has room for four people to sleep, a toilet, and large depository. Even a small kitchenette is built-in. The boat was first used as a real family boat in the 1970s but now solo and duo sailers also discovered this small but fast sailing boat.
