= Colibri Group =

American men's accessory company

Colibri
- Founded: 1928
- Headquarters: CST Enterprises LLC; 237 West 37th Street; 10th floor New York, NY 10018
- Products: Lighters; Jewelry; Smoking Accessories; Small Leather Goods; Writing Instruments; Time Pieces
- Website: colibri.com

Colibri is a company that supplies men's accessories. Founded in 1928, Colibri initially manufactured cigarette lighters, for which they became known. The company later supplied other products, including jewelry, smoking accessories, small leather goods and writing instruments.

== History and background ==
Colibri was founded in 1928 by Julius Lowenthal. In 1935, Colibri launched the fully automatic ‘Monopol’ lighter, which had an acceleration system. From 1940 to 1945 Colibri produced the ‘Stormgard’ lighter designed for soldiers fighting in World War II. In 1952, Julius Lowenthal's son Jack joined Colibri. Colibri produced a lighter with a visible multiple gas refill and a hydraulic auto-flint system in 1958, and an electric lighter, which they named Molectric in 1967.

In 1974, for the James Bond film The Man with the Golden Gun, Colibri supplied the golden gun, which was constructed from a Molectric 88 lighter, cufflinks, cigarette case and fountain pen. Later in 1974, Colibri sponsored the winning Lombard RAC rally team, driven by Henry Liddon and Timo Mäkinen.

In the 1980s, Jack's son David joined Colibri, which then started supplying items such as Swiss watches, cufflinks, and pens. In 2001 the Vortex and Trifecta lines were introduced, with pyramidal twin-flame and triple flame lighters. On January 14, 2009, the company abruptly closed its doors announcing it was seeking the protections of filing a petition of receivership with the state of Rhode Island. In February 2009 Colibri changed ownership, and moved their head office from Providence to New York City, USA.

== History of products ==
- 1928 –The ‘Colibri Original’ was launched.
- 1935 – Fully automatic ‘Monopol’ lighter.
- 1940 – ‘Stormgard’ lighter for soldiers during World War II.
- 1958 – Colibri invents the first visible multi-gas refill and the hydraulic auto flint system.
- 1958 – Swiss-made Monopol watch.
- 1960 – Monopol cigarette case.
- 1961 – Colibri invented the Piezo Electric lighter.
- 1967 – Molectric 88 Silver lighter.
- 1970 - 6-jewel encrusted gold lighters.
- 1977 – ‘Sensatron’ Battery operated touch lighter.
- 1980 – Launch of Colibri Pens and Cufflinks.
- 1982 – Power flame plus lighter, a three-way wind resistant lighter.
- 1985 – Pipe lighter with adjustable flame.
- 1987 – Quantum, the first windproof lighter.
- 1998 – Double guillotine cutter and cigar punch cutter accessories.
- 2001 – Pyramidal dual-flame lighter.
- 2001 – The Trifecta – triple flame lighter.
- 2002 – The Summit - a high altitude ignition system lighter.
- 2011 – The 2011 collection; new lighter models, cufflinks, money clips, pens, and small leather goods.
- 2011 – Colibri logo re-branding.

== Colibri jewelry ==
In 2011 Colibri launched its C, D and T series jewelry range, with cufflinks, money clips, pens and leather goods. The cufflinks are made of a variety of materials including polished steel and semi-precious inlays of malachite, black onyx, black pearl, mother-of-pearl and peridot. T Series cufflinks included alligator leather centers.
