= Orkney Heritage Society =

Nonprofit organisation founded in 1968

The Orkney Heritage Society in Orkney, Scotland, is a nonprofit organisation founded in 1968.

It promotes "the beauty, history and character of Orkney" as well as "high standards of architecture and planning" in Orkney. It organizes conferences and grants awards and prizes for writing, historical and architectural projects. It publishes New Orkney Antiquarian Journal as well as a newsletter and other publications.

Its founder members were:

- Ernest Marwick
- Laura Grimond

Orkney Heritage Society is a registered charity.

== See also ==
- Orkney dialect
- Orkney lamb
- Orkney Single Malts
- Orkney vole
- Orkney Yole
