= Yole =

Type of boat

A yole is a clinker-built boat that was used for fishing particularly in the north of Scotland. The best known of these is the Orkney Yole. They were rigged for sail or used as rowing boats. The yole is a Nordic design and closely related in shape to the Shetland Yoal and Sgoth Niseach of the Outer Hebrides. Another related craft is the Stroma Yole.

== See also ==
- Orkney Heritage Society
