= Flat-bottomed boat =

Boat with a flat bottom

Man piloting a johnboat on the Speed River within Idylwild Park

A flat-bottomed boat is a boat with a shallow draft, two-chined hull, which allows it to be used in shallow bodies of water, such as rivers, because it is less likely to ground.

The flat hull also makes the boat more stable in calm water, which is good for hunters and anglers. However this design becomes less stable in choppy water. This is because it causes the boat to travel on the water, instead of through it, as a boat with a rounded or V-shaped hull would.

Flat hulls are simple to construct, making them popular with boat-building hobbyists.

In Britain they came to popular notice during the planned French invasion of Britain in 1759, when a large-number of flat-bottomed boats were prepared by the French to ferry their invasion force across the channel and a number were destroyed during the British Raid on Le Havre. The flat-bottoms are mentioned in the song Heart of Oak written by David Garrick during 1759.

== Types ==
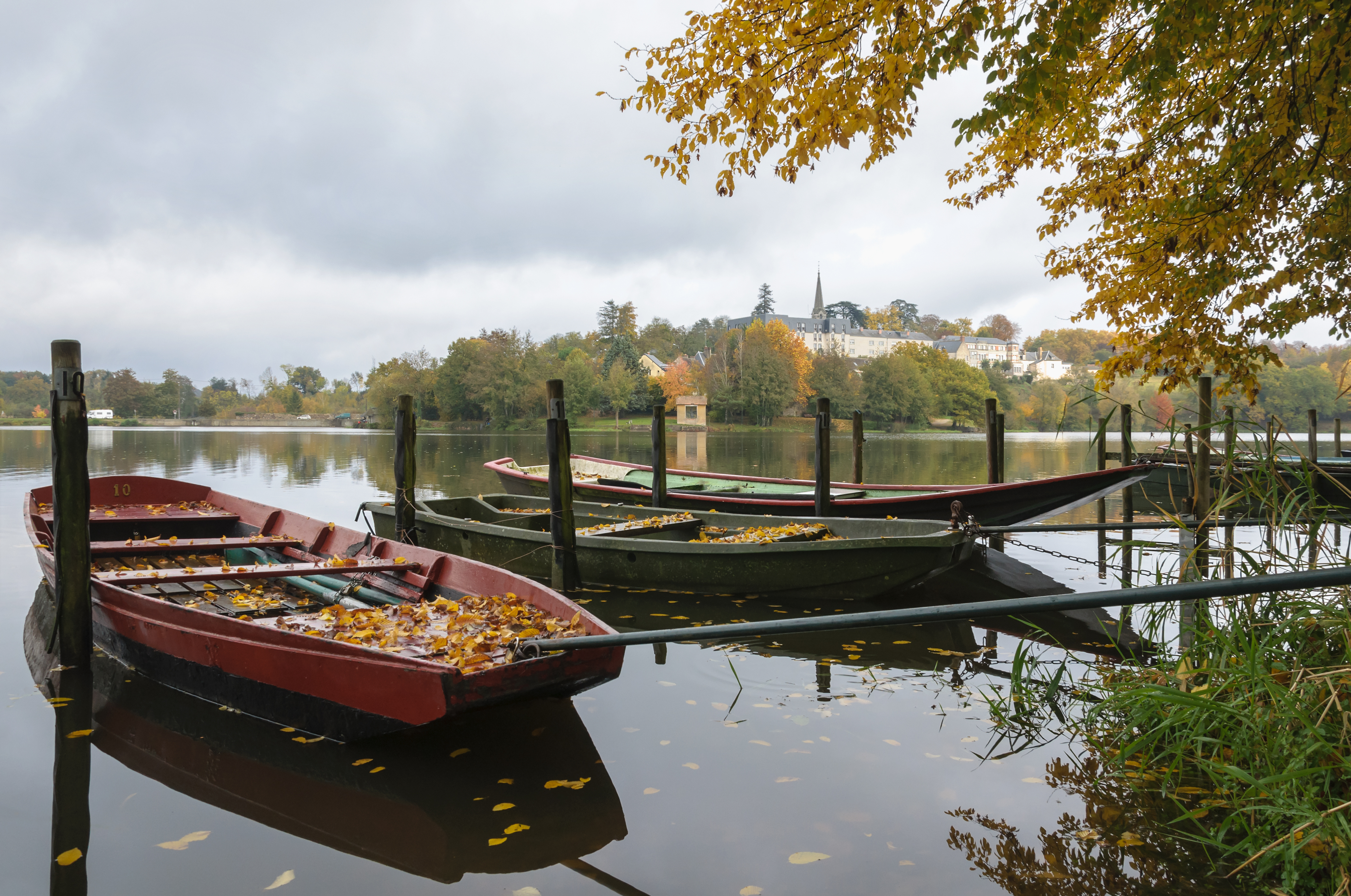
Flat-bottomed boats on a pond, Château-la-Vallière, France

- Barge
- Bateau
- Bull boat
- Car float
- Coracle
- Currach
- Dory
- Durham boat
- Dutch barge
- Flatboat
- Gondola
- Johnboat
- Keelboat
- Landing Ship, Tank
- Norfolk punt
- Pirogue
- Pontoon boat
- Pram
- Punt
- Pünte
- Quffah
- Sandolo
- Scow
- Sharpie (boat)
- Thames sailing barge
- Trow

== See also ==
- Horse-drawn boat
- Pedalo
- Pusher (boat)
- Towpath
