= Tarai-bune =

Traditional Japanese fishing boat

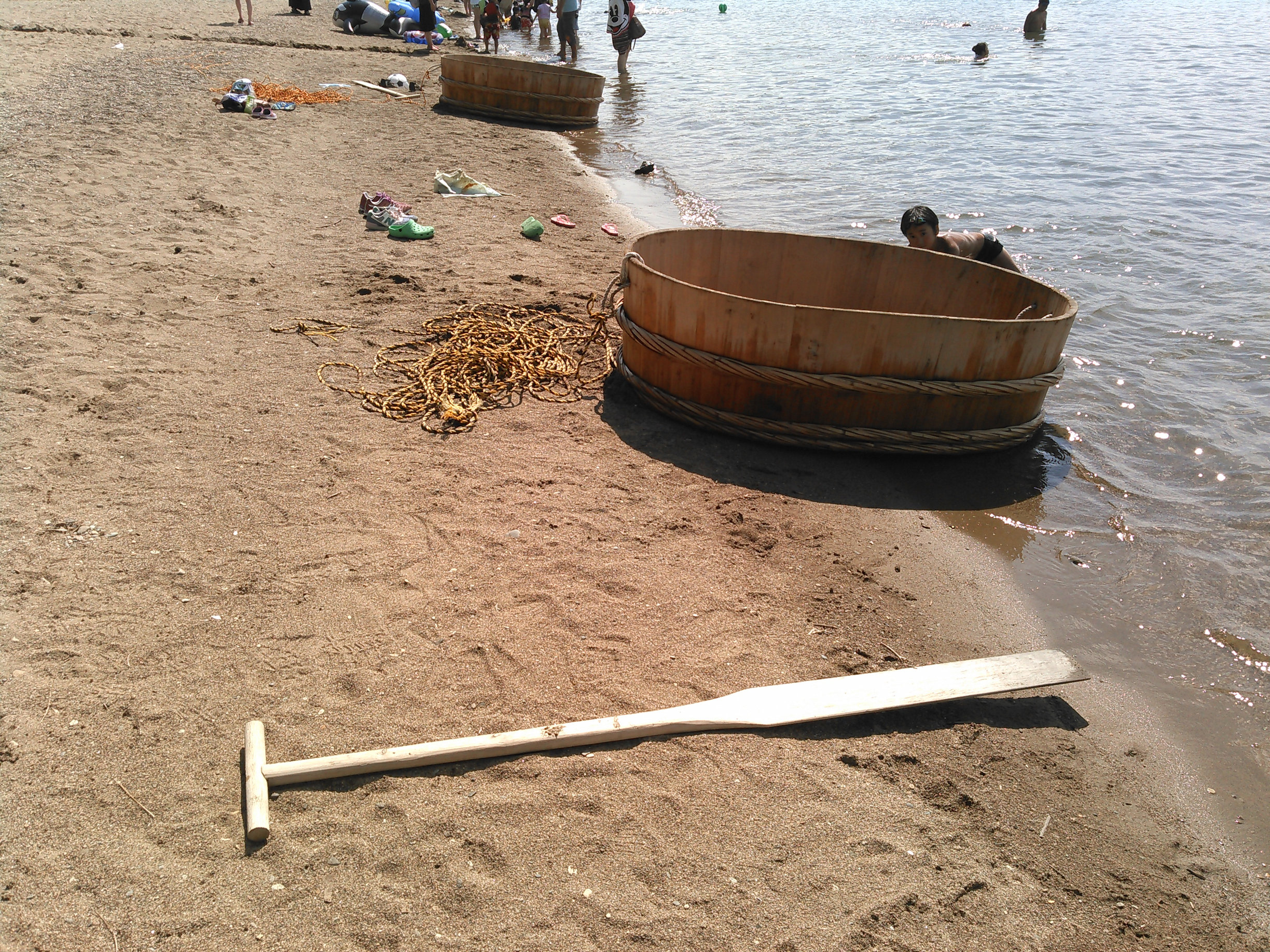
A tarai-bune on the shore with its paddle

A tarai-bune (Japanese: たらい舟), or tub-turned boat, is a traditional Japanese fishing boat originally made from half a barrel or large tub. They were formerly used throughout Western Japan but are now found only on Sado Island where about a hundred are left which are used for collecting abalone and seaweed. They are still effective close to shore and in the narrow coves formed by earthquakes.

== In popular culture ==
Tarai Bune boats have appeared in:

- Spirited Away, animated movie
- Skies of Arcadia, video game by Sega
- Tales of Symphonia, video game by Bandai Namco
- Tides, video game by Shallot Games

== See also ==
- Coracle
- Currach
- Fishing coracle
- Kuphar
- Kayak
- Umiak
