= Galway hooker =

Ship type

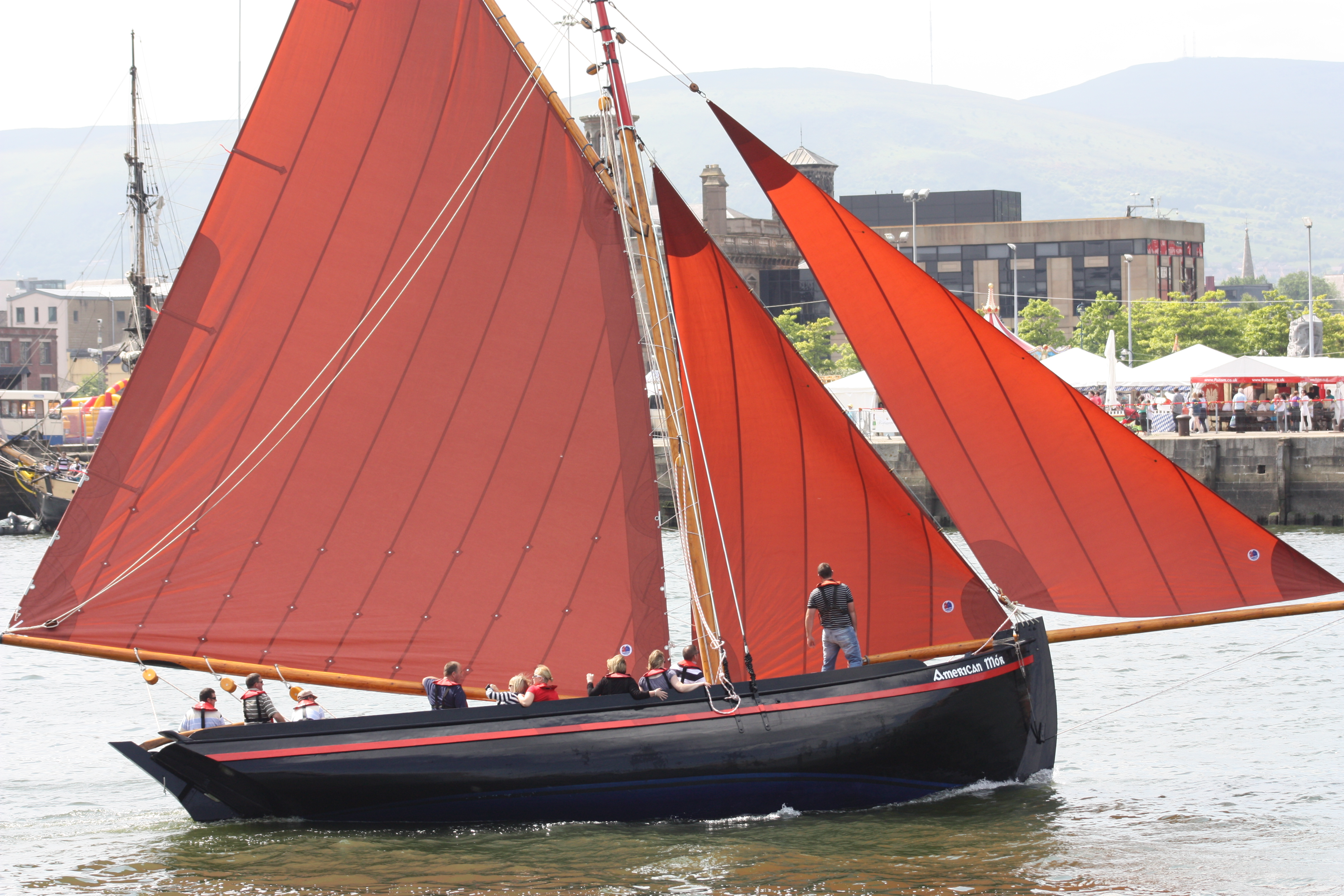
American Mór, a Galway hooker

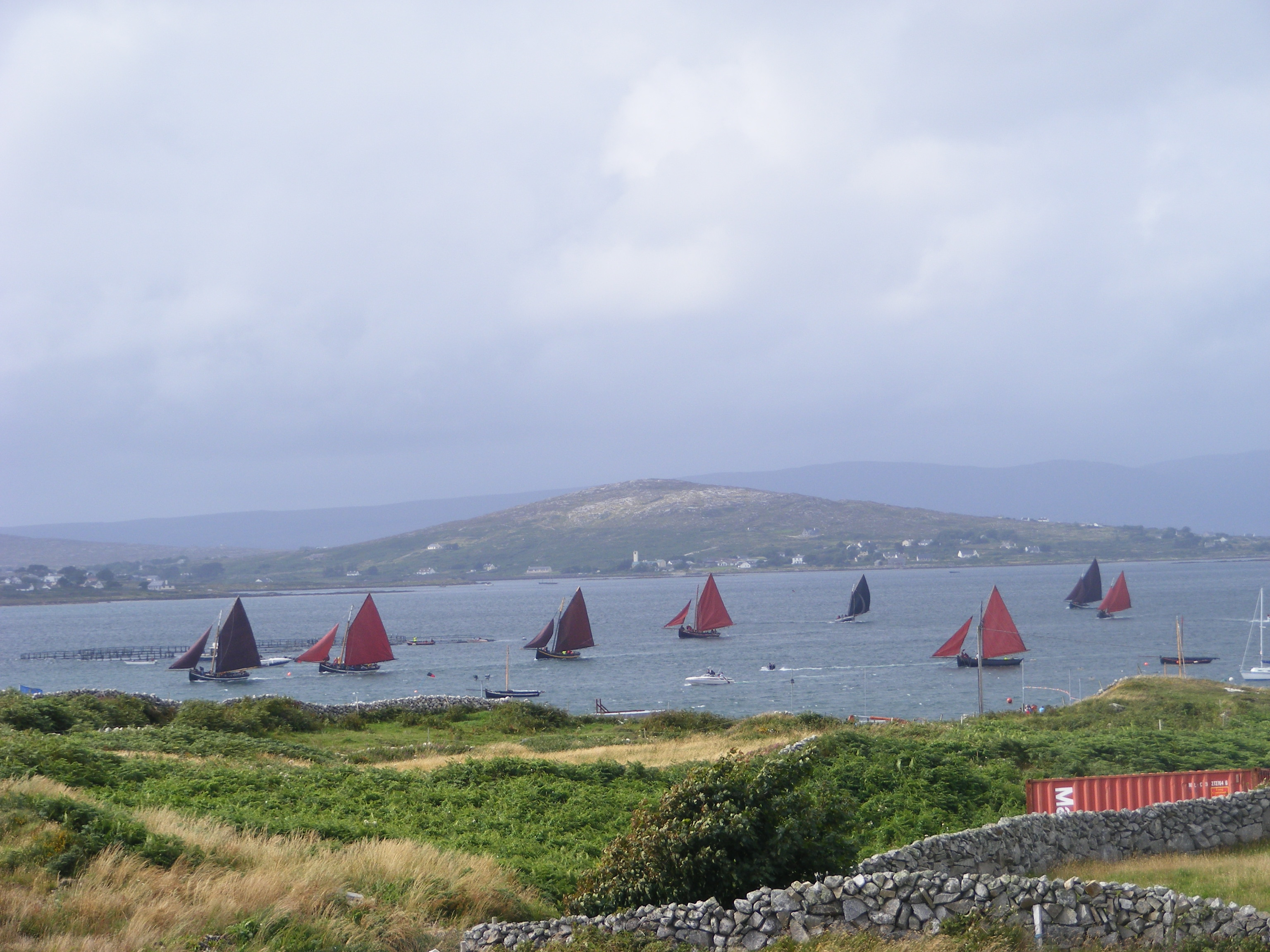
Galway hookers race in Caladh Thaidhg An Cheathrú Rua during summer regatta

The Galway hooker (Irish: húicéir) is a traditional fishing boat used in Galway Bay off the west coast of Ireland. The hooker was developed for the strong seas there. It is identified by its sharp, clean entry, bluff bow, marked tumblehome and raked transom. Its sail plan consists of a single mast with a main sail and two foresails. Traditionally, the boat is black (being coated in pitch) and the sails are a dark red-brown.

From the late 20th century, there has been a revival of and renewed interest in the Galway hooker, and the boats are still being constructed. The festival of Cruinniú na mBád is held each year, when boats race across Galway Bay from Connemara to Kinvara on the border between County Galway and County Clare.

== Classes of Galway hooker ==
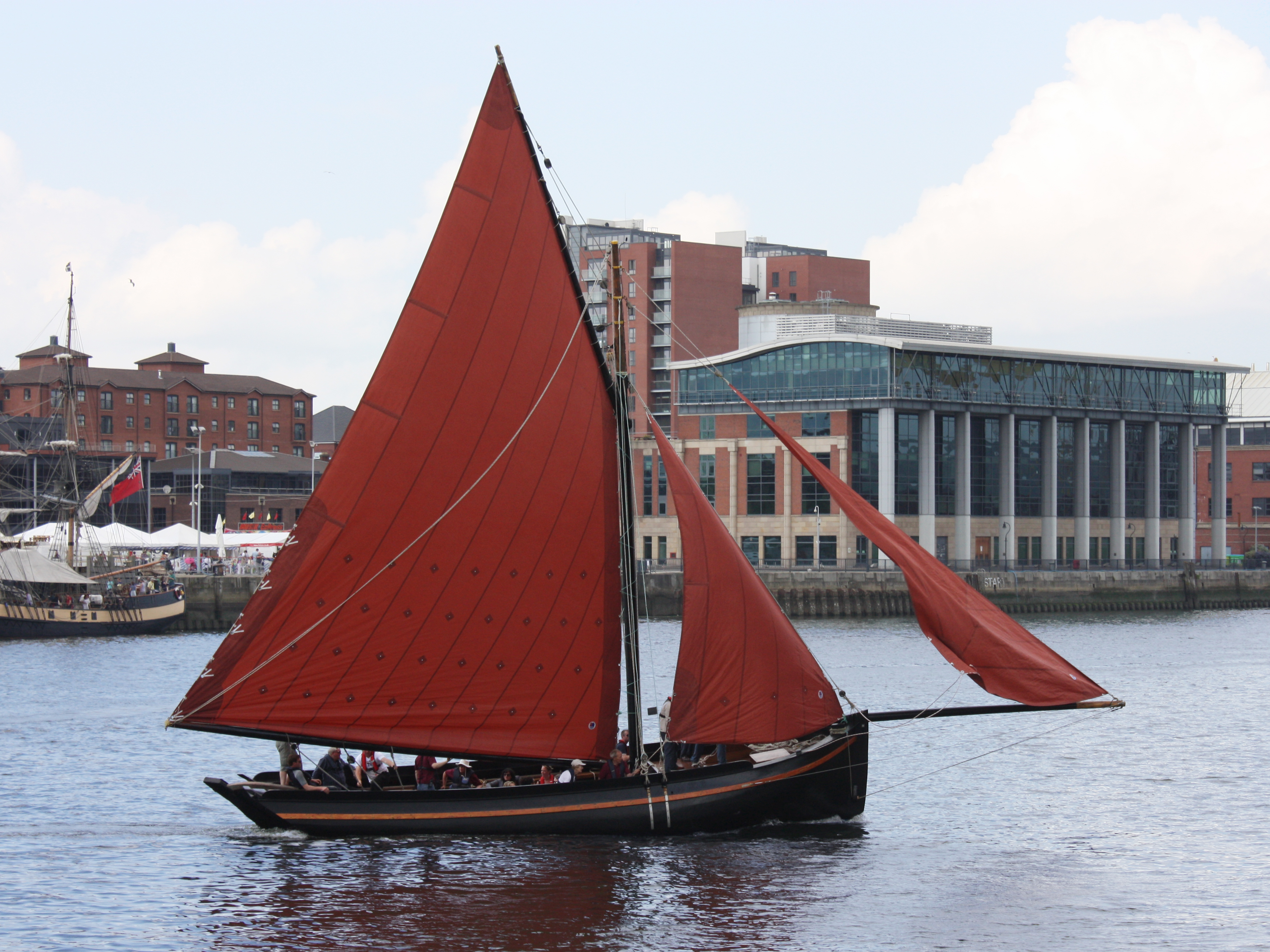
Galway hooker under sail at Belfast Titanic Maritime Festival, Queen's Quay, Belfast, Northern Ireland, June 2010

The hooker refers to four classes of boats. All are named in Irish. The Bád Mór (big boat) ranges in length from 10.5 to 13.5 metres (35 to 44 feet). The smaller Leathbhád (half-boat) is about 10 metres (28 feet) in length. Both the Bád Mór and Leathbhád are decked forward of the mast. These boats were used to carry turf to be used as fuel across Galway Bay from Connemara and County Mayo to the Aran Islands and the Burren. The boats often brought limestone on the return journeys, to neutralise the acid soils of Connemara and Mayo. The Gleoiteog ranges in length from 7 to 9 metres (24 to 28 feet), and has the same sails and rigging as the larger boats. They were used for fishing and carrying cargo. Another boat, the Púcán, is similar in size to the Gleoiteog but has a lug mainsail and a foresail. These smaller boats were entirely open.

There was also a class fitted with a cockpit floor over the ballast used for fishing. When the Irish settlers at Boston in North America needed fishing craft, they built the hooker that they knew from home. These boats became known as 'Boston Hookers', 'Irish Cutters' (in official reports), or 'Paddy Boats'.

While a utilitarian boat, suited for the shallow waters of Galway Bay and being capable of being beached where necessary, the Galway Hooker is prone to being swamped and sinking in a short time in the absence of a cabin and high freeboard. Eighty-two shipwrecks are recorded in the unpublished 'Shipwreck Inventory of Wrecks for Galway Bay'. These wrecks date to between 1750 and 1938; of them, 59 are from the 19th century. No records are known to exist for the period prior to the 18th century. Cargo throughout this period would usually be held in wooden casks varnished with fish oil for waterproofing.

== Appearance ==
Galway hookers are noted for their distinctive black hulls and red sails. The origin of their appearance goes back to the 19th century, when Galway sailors would coat their sails in a solution made of tree bark, rich in tannins. This technique, known as "barking", protected the fabric from mould, mildew, and rot but also dyed the sails a shade of "rust-red". Although modern sails no longer require this treatment, modern Galway hookers continue to fly red sails to maintain the traditional appearance. The black hulls of the boats came from sailors coating the hulls in black tar.

== In popular culture ==
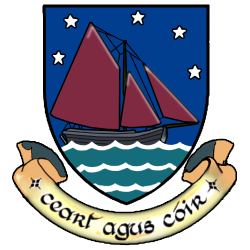

- The Hooker appears on the coat of arms of County Galway.
- A song in the film Darby O'Gill and the Little People includes the line "crimson sails of Galway Bay, the fishermen unfurl".

== See also ==
- Currach
- Seoighe Inish Bearachain
