= Coracle =

Kind of boat

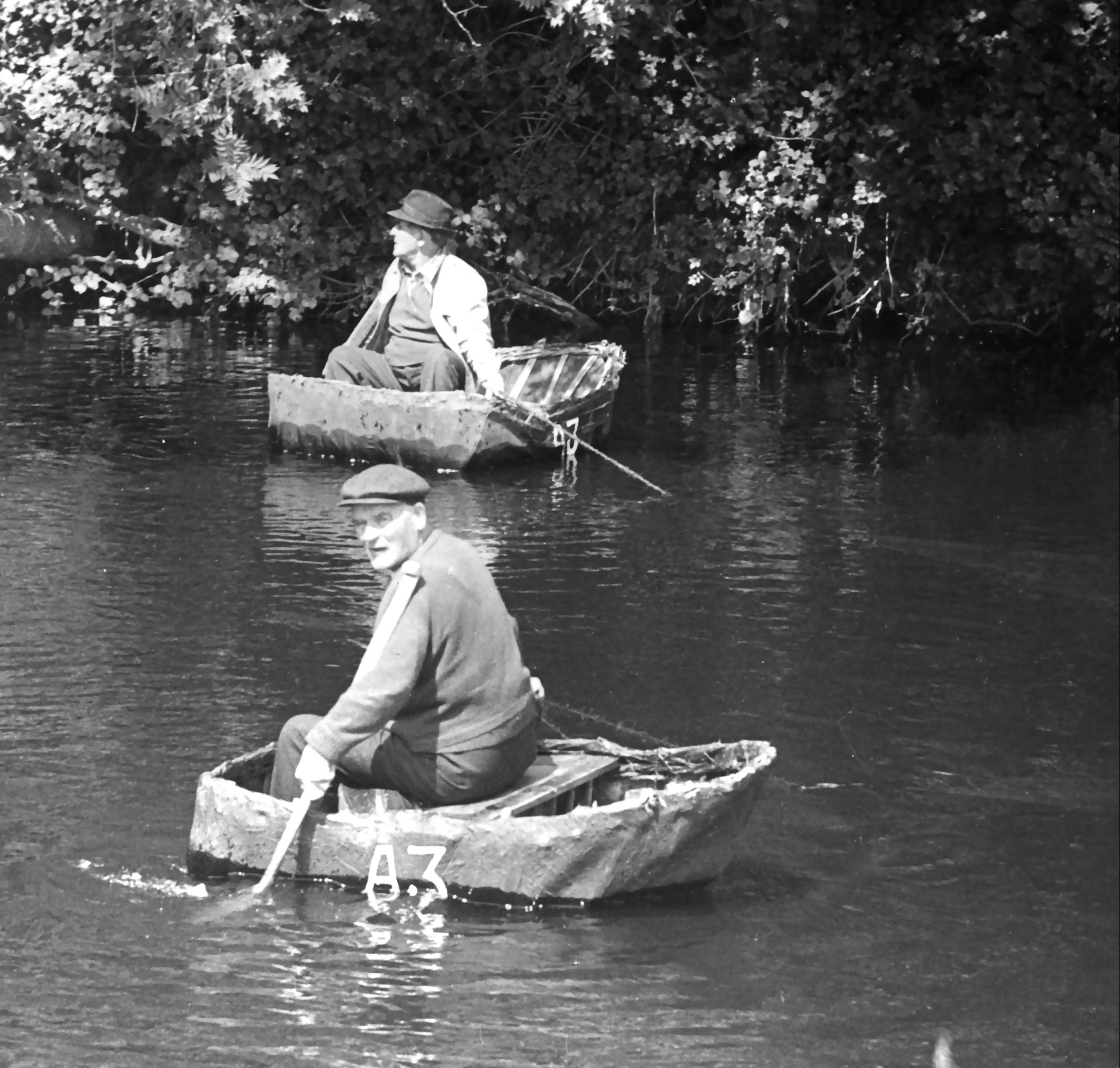
The River Teifi, West Wales The two men are John Davies (forefront) and Will Davies of Cenarth; the last two legitimate coracle fishermen in Cenarth. They are both using the single-arm method of propulsion; a means of gliding downstream in a controlled way. They carry their coracles and their fish home on their backs. (1972)

A coracle is a small, rounded, lightweight boat traditionally used in Wales, Ireland, particularly on the River Boyne, and Scotland, particularly on the River Spey. The word is also used for similar boats found in India, Vietnam, Iraq, and Tibet. The word coracle is an English spelling of the original Welsh cwrwgl, cognate with Irish and Scottish Gaelic currach, and is recorded in English text as early as the sixteenth century. Other historical English spellings include corougle, corracle, curricle and coricle.

== Structure ==
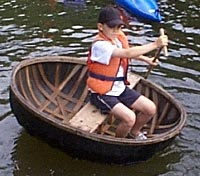
Coracle on the River Severn near Ironbridge

A typical coracle's structure consists of a framework of split, interwoven willow rods, tied with willow bark. The outer layer was originally an animal skin such as horse or bullock hide (corium), with a thin layer of tar to waterproof it; today replaced by tarred calico, canvas, or fibreglass. The Vietnamese/Asian version of the coracle is made of interwoven bamboo and made water proof by using resin and coconut oil. Oval in shape and very similar to half a walnut shell, the coracle has a keel-less flat bottom to evenly spread the load across the structure and to reduce the required depth of water; often to only a few inches. This structure helps to make the boat more maneuverable and less likely to snag when used on narrow and/or shallow slow-running waterways.

Each coracle is tailored to the local river conditions. In general there is one design per river, but this is not always the case. The Teifi coracle, for instance, is flat-bottomed, as it is designed to negotiate shallow rapids, like at Cenarth Falls, while the Carmarthen coracle is rounder and deeper, because it is used in tidal waters on the Tywi, where there are no rapids. Teifi coracles are made from locally harvested wood: willow for the laths (body of the boat), hazel for the weave (Y bleth in Welsh.) Tywi coracles have been made from sawn ash for a long time. The working boats tend to be made from fiberglass these days. Teifi coracles use no nails, relying on the interweaving of the laths for structural coherence, whilst the Carmarthen ones use copper nails and interweaving.

They are an effective fishing vessel because, when powered by a skilled person, they hardly disturb the water or the fish, and they can be easily manoeuvred with one arm, while the other arm tends to the net; two coracles to a net. The coracle is propelled by means of a broad-bladed paddle, which traditionally varies in design between different rivers. It is used in a sculling action, the blade describing a figure-of-eight pattern in the water. The paddle is used towards the front of the coracle, pulling the boat forward, with the paddler facing in the direction of travel.

The Welsh Coracle is intended to be carried on the back; Welsh saying is Llwyth dyn ei gorwgl (load of a man is his coracle).

== History ==
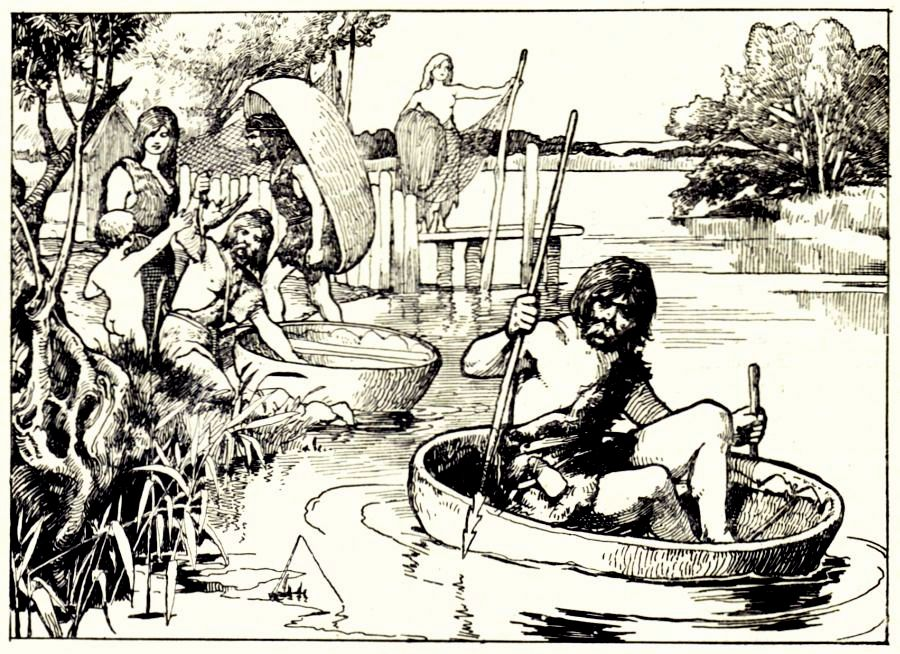
Britons with coracles – from Cassell's History of England, Vol. I, 1909

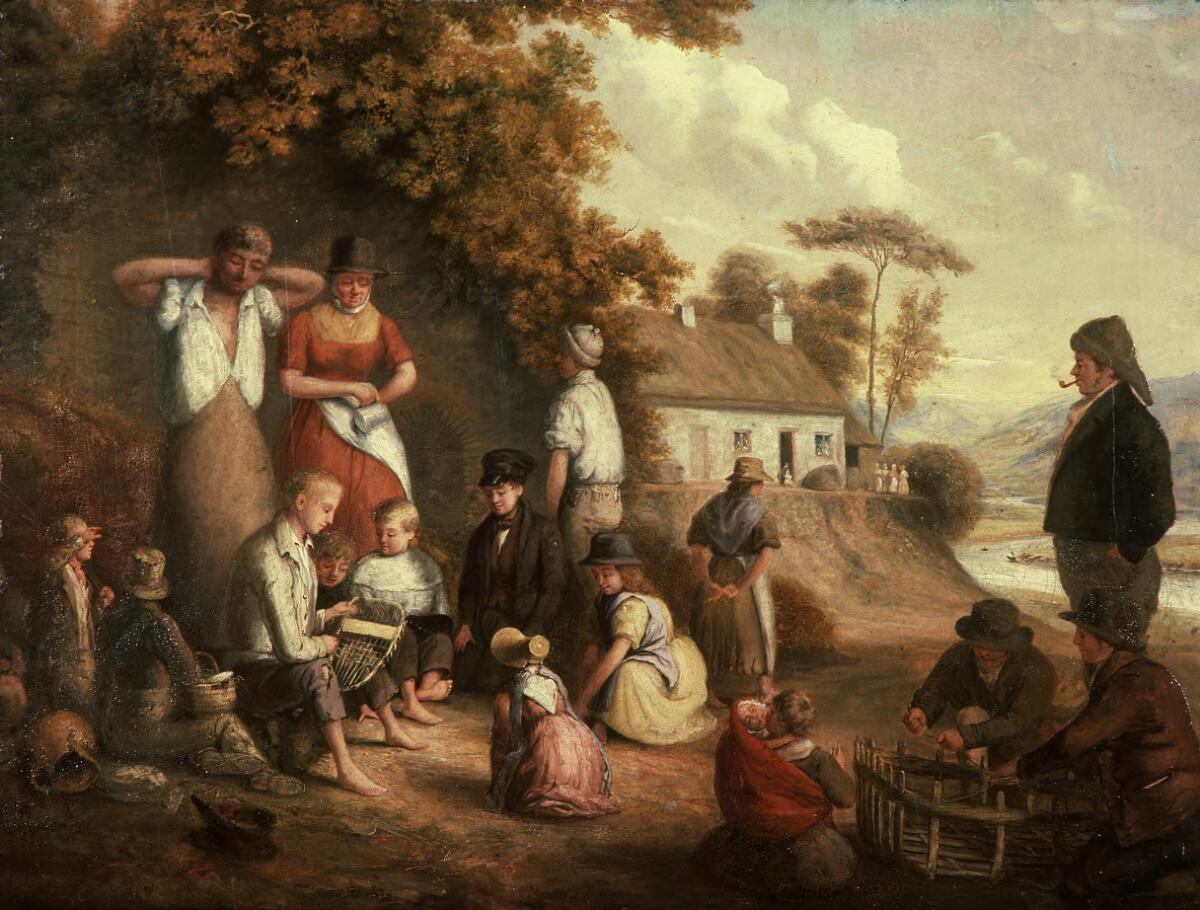
Coracle makers in Wales c.1842

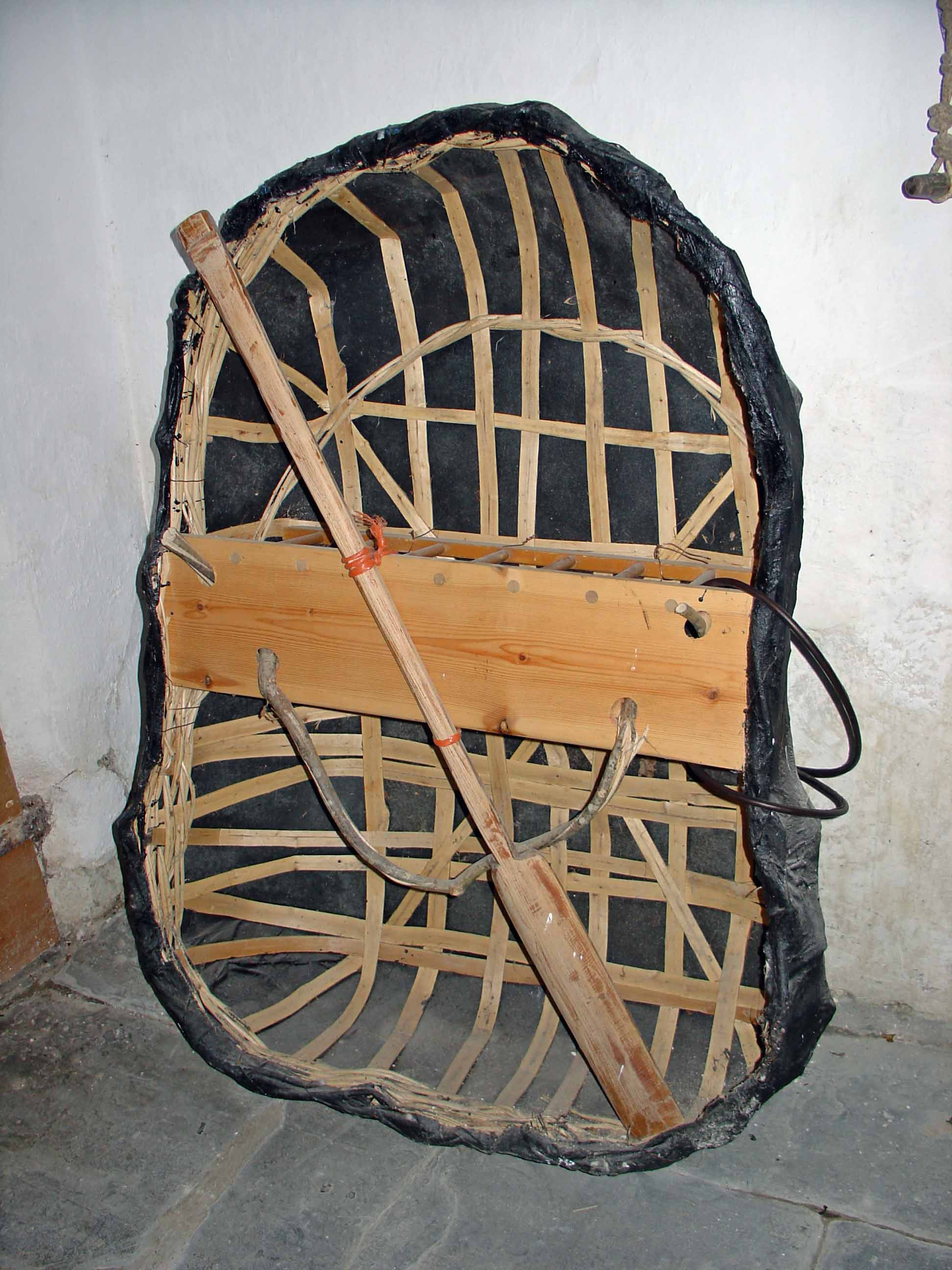
Typical River Teifi coracle in Manordeifi Old Church

Designed for use in swiftly flowing streams, the coracle has been in use on the British Isles for millennia, having been noted by Julius Caesar in his invasion of Britain in the mid first century BC, and used in his military campaigns in Spain. Remains interpreted as a possible coracle were found in an Early Bronze Age grave at Barns Farm near Dalgety Bay, and others have been described, from Corbridge and from near North Ferriby.

Where coracle fishing is performed by two coraclers the net is stretched across the river between the two coracles. The coraclers will paddle one handed, dragging the net in the other, and draw the net downstream. When a fish is caught, each hauls up an end of the net until the two boats are brought to touch, and the fish is then secured, using a priest (or knocker – a small block of wood) to stun the fish.

A new tax was introduced in 1863 on the commercial capture of migratory fish in Wales; this led to a decline in the number of coracles. During the 1930s, the government decided to begin revoking the licences of commercial fisher families on the death of the main licensees. It took some years for this plan to be completed but eventually led to a more significant decline in the number of craft.

In the 1920s and 30s James Hornell visited hundreds of rivers in the British Isles to talk with remaining coracle makers and users. He documented the tradition in his book British Coracles and the Curraghs of Ireland (The Society for Nautical Research, 1938) containing drawings, diagrams and construction details gleaned from regular makers.

=== Current status ===
Coracles are now seen regularly only in tourist areas of West Wales, and irregularly in Shropshire on the River Severn. A public house in Sundorne, Shrewsbury called "The Coracle" has a pub sign featuring a man using a coracle on a river. The Welsh rivers Teifi and Tywi are the most common places to find coracles in Wales. On the Teifi they are most frequently seen between Cenarth, and Cilgerran and the village of Llechryd.

In 1974, a Welsh coracle piloted by Bernard Thomas (c. 1923–2014) of Llechryd crossed the English Channel to France in 13 1/2 hours. The journey was undertaken to support a claim that Bull Boats of the Mandan Indians of North Dakota in the US could have been copied from coracles introduced by Prince Madog in the 12th century.

For many years until 1979, Shrewsbury coracle maker Fred Davies achieved some notability amongst football fans; he would sit in his coracle during Shrewsbury Town FC home matches at Gay Meadow, and retrieve stray balls from the River Severn. Although Davies died in 1994, his story is still associated with the club.

== Safety ==
The design of the coracle makes it an unstable craft. Because it sits "on" the water, rather than "in" it, the vessel can easily be carried by currents and the wind. The Coracle Society has published guidelines for safely using coracles.

== Similar craft ==
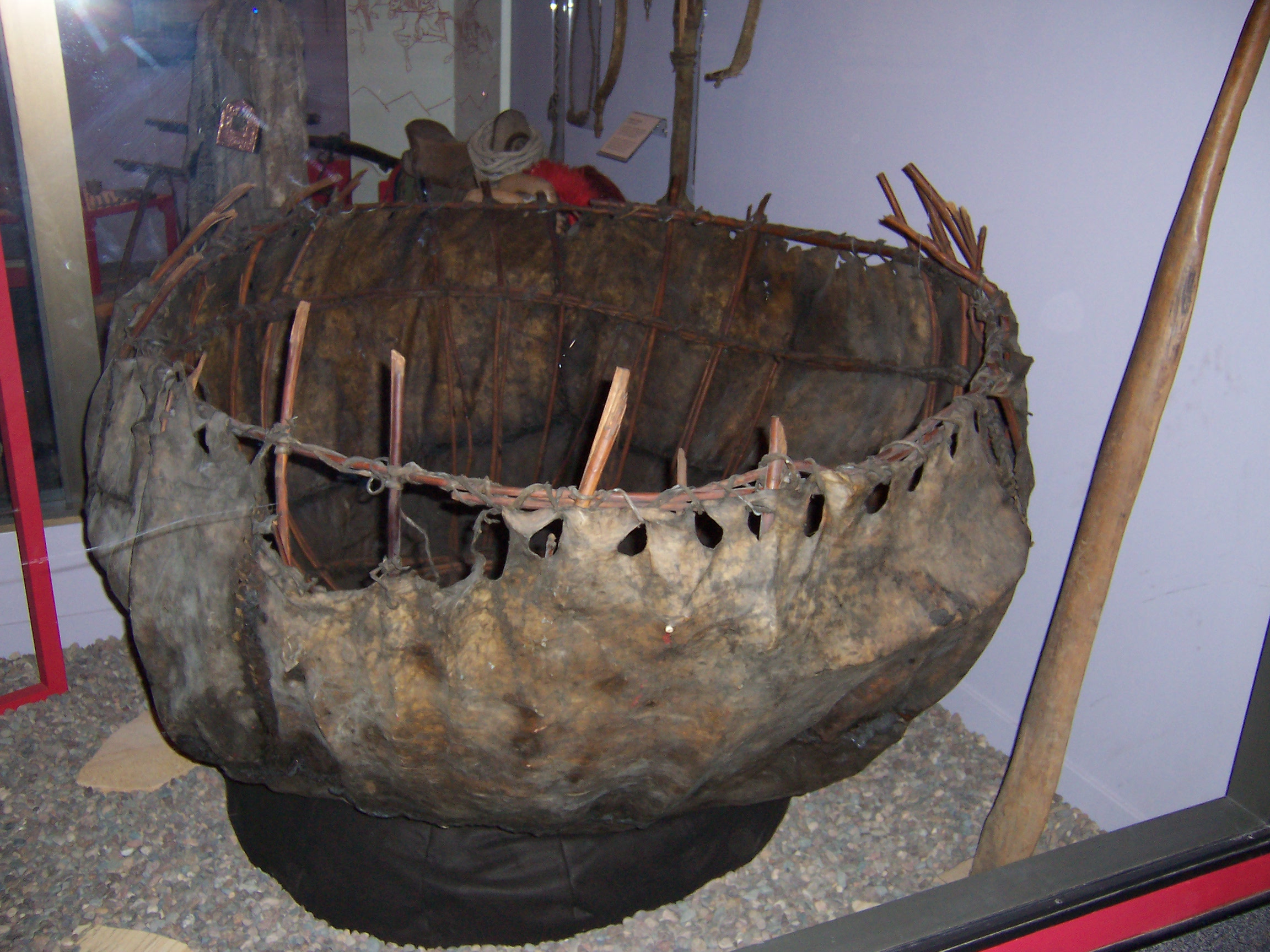
The Ku-Dru or Kowa of Tibet is very similar to a coracle. Field Museum of Natural History, Chicago, US

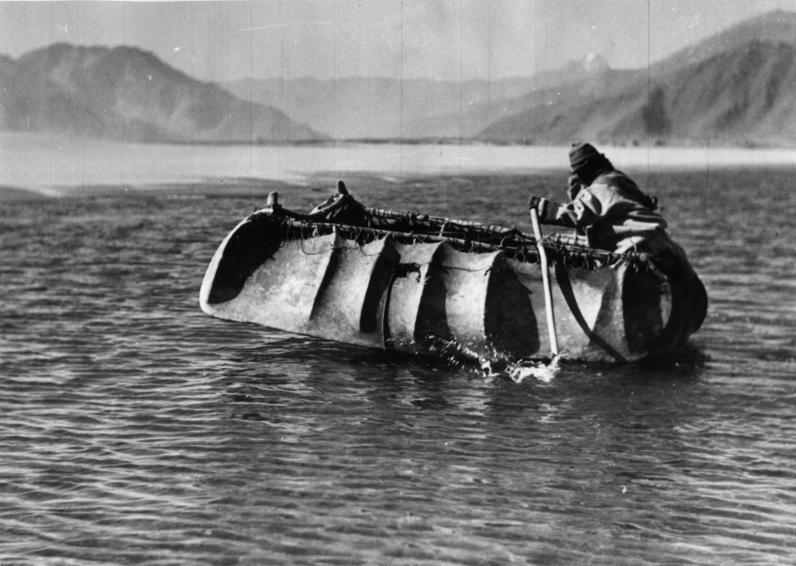
Yak skin coracle in Tibet, 1938

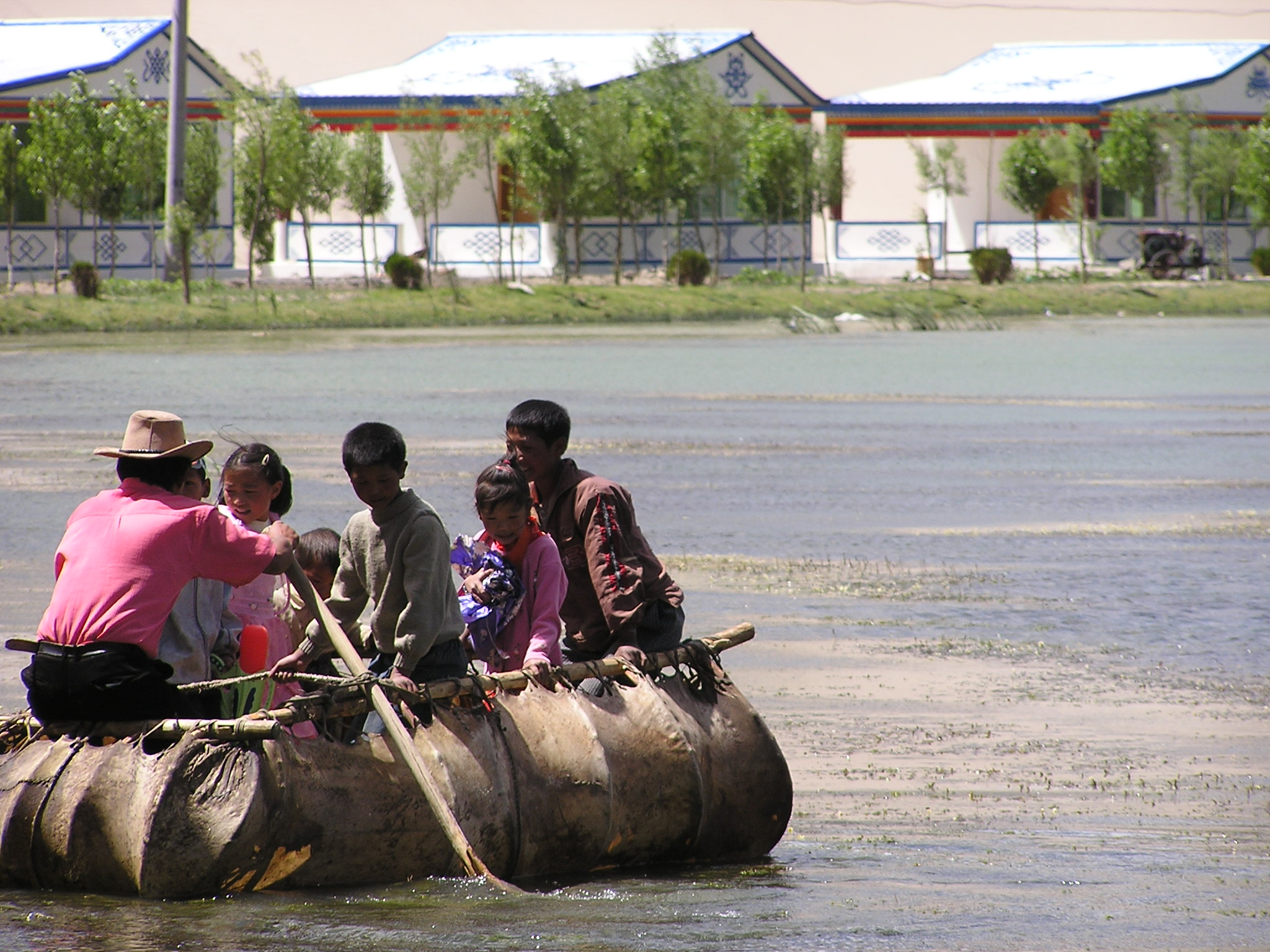
Yak skin coracle in Tibet, 2006

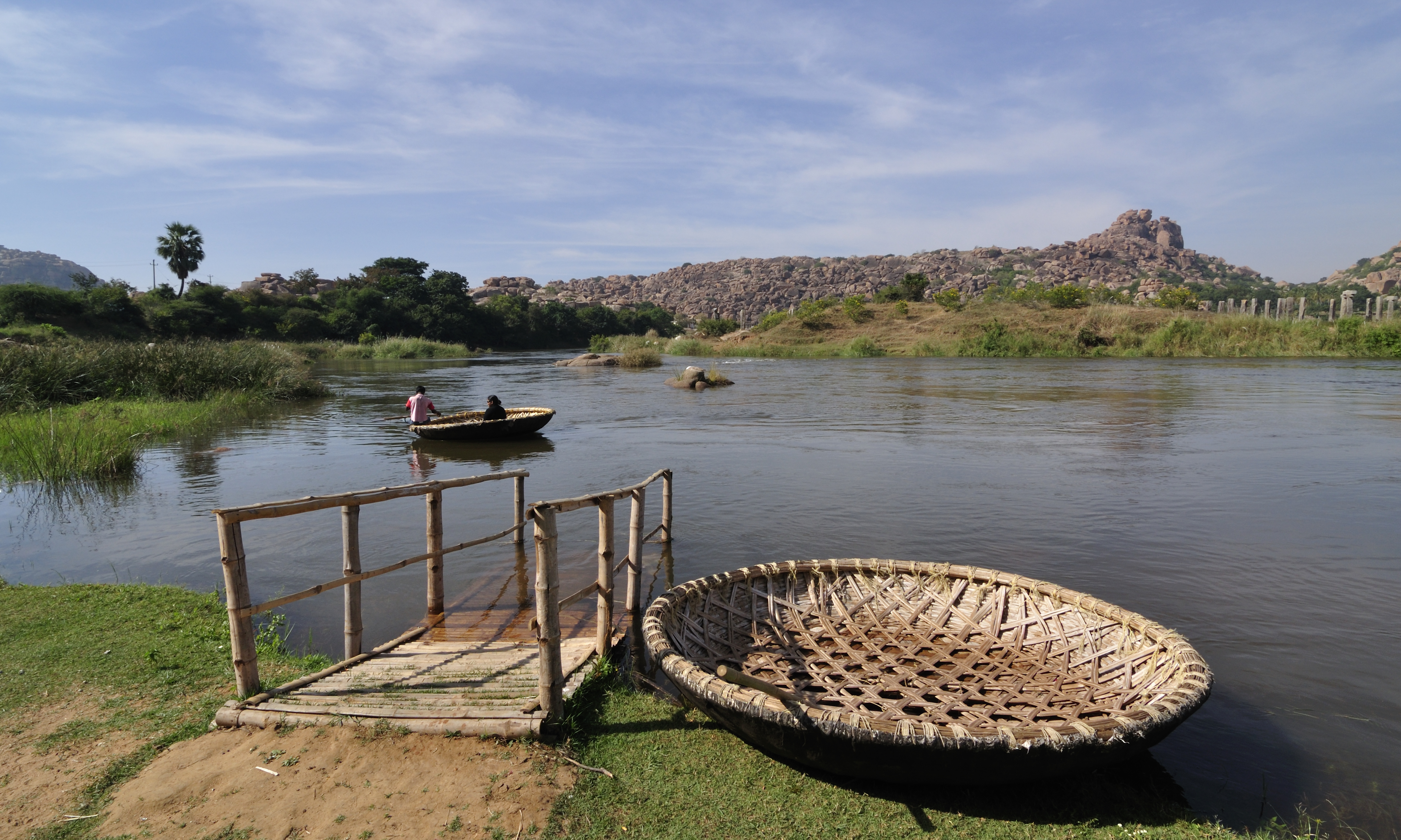
An Indian coracle near the River Tungabhadra, in Hampi India

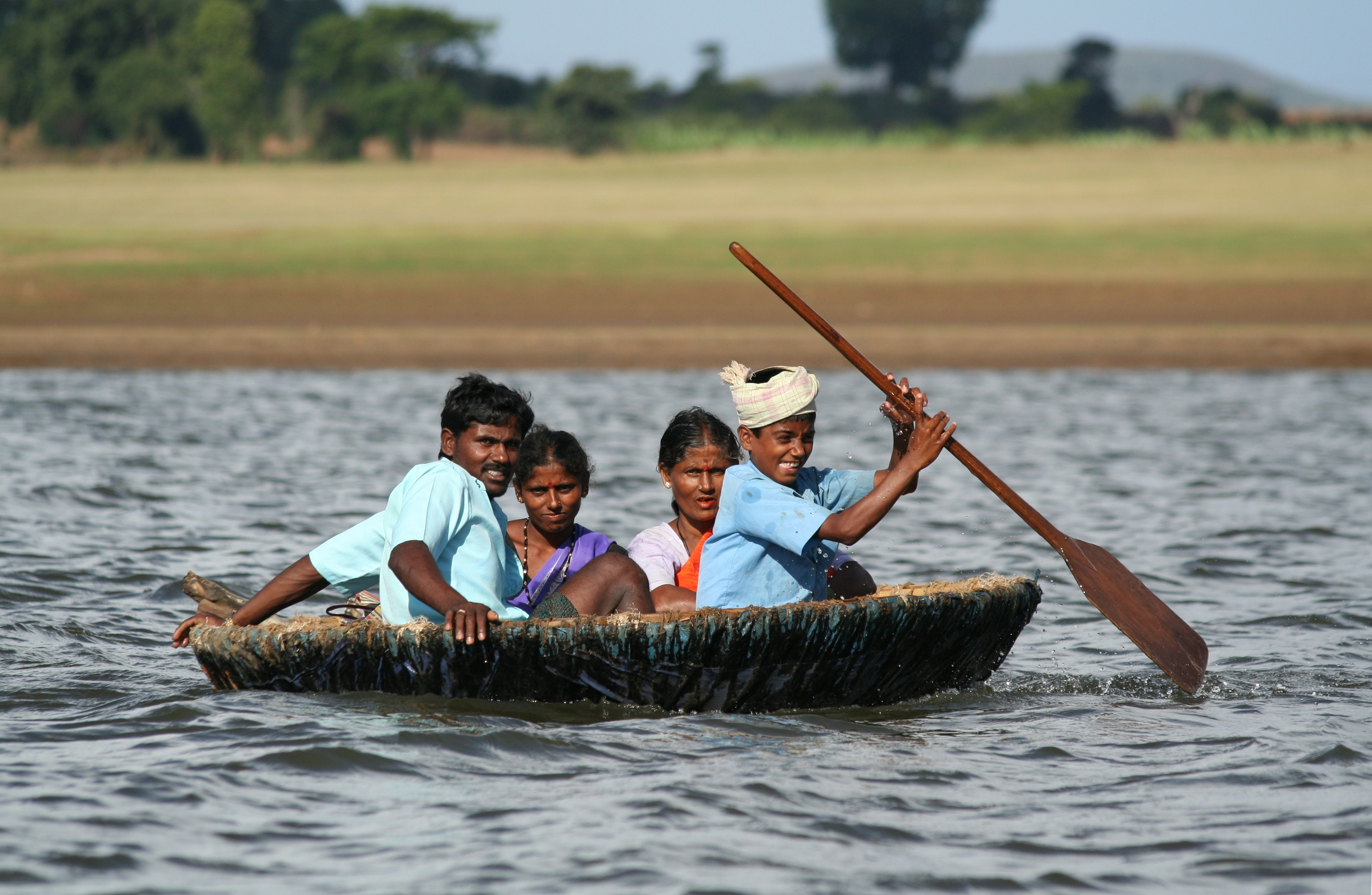
Indian coracles are frequently used on the Kabini River, Karnataka, India

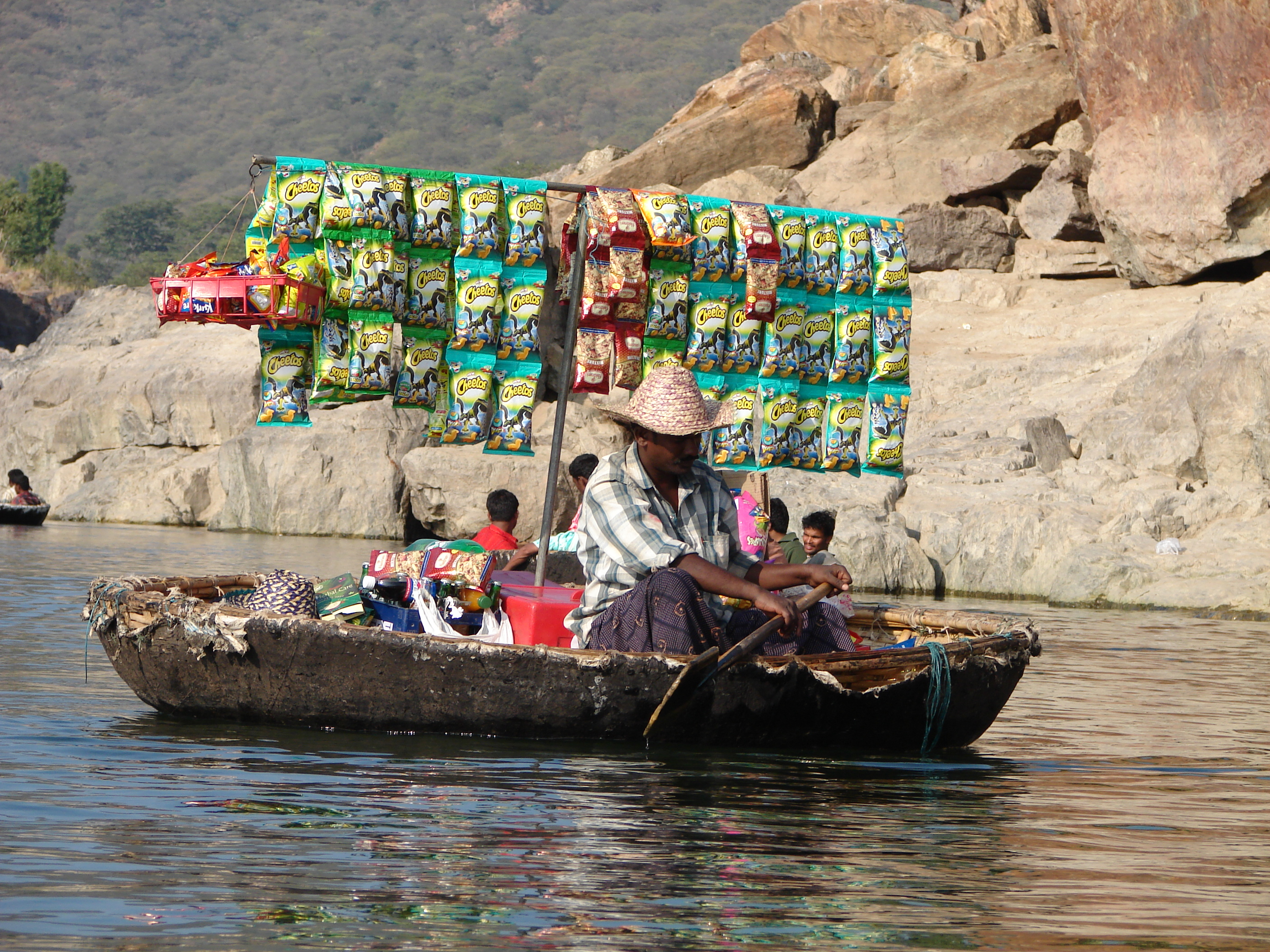
Coracle on the Kaveri river. Some like this are used by vendors

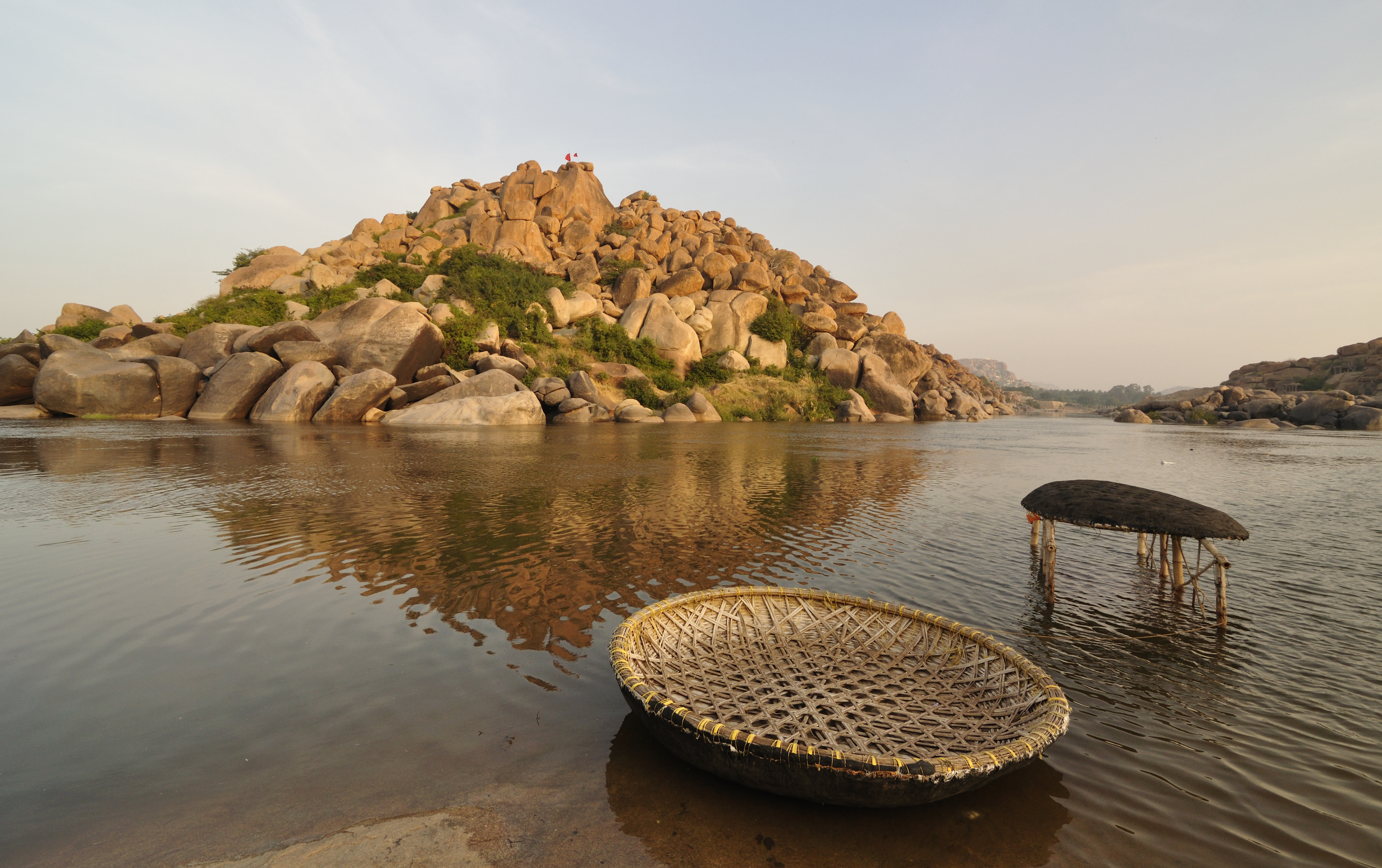
Two Indian coracles on the Tungabhadra River

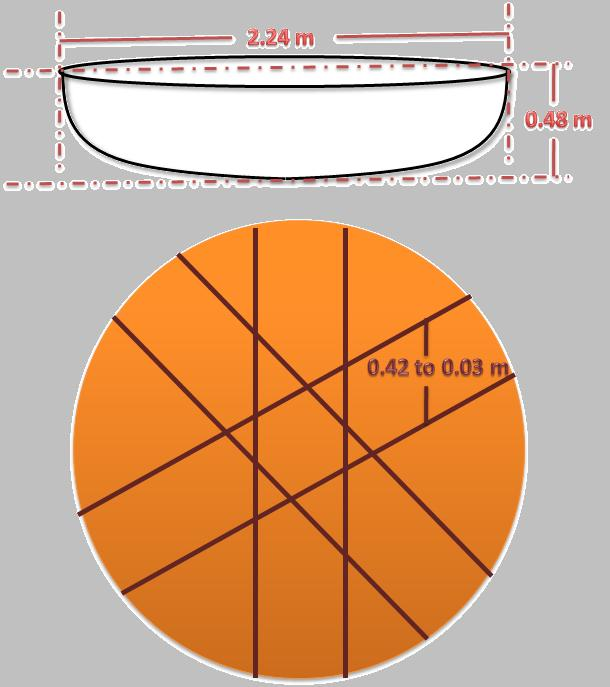
Dimensions of Indian coracles

An Iraqi coracle, or quffa (قفة), in Baghdad in 1914

The oldest instructions yet found for construction of a coracle are contained in precise directions on a four-thousand-year-old cuneiform tablet supposedly dictated by the Mesopotamian god Enki to Atra-Hasis on how to build a round "ark". The tablet is about 2,250 years older than previously discovered accounts of flood myths, none of which contain such details. These instructions depict a vessel that is today known as a quffa (قفة), or Iraqi coracle.

Many scholars believe that the basket that baby Moses was cast adrift in on the Nile (in Exodus 2:3) was in fact a coracle or quffa, based on the similarity of that passage to Neo-Assyrian legends depicting infants cast adrift on rivers in quffas.

The Irish curach (also currach or curragh) is a similar, but larger, vessel still in use today. Curachs were also used in the west of Scotland:

The curach or boat of leather and wicker may seem to moderns a very unsafe vehicle, to trust to tempestuous seas, yet our forefathers fearlessly committed themselves in these slight vehicles to the mercy of the most violent weather. They were once much in use in the Western Isles of Scotland, and are still found in Wales. The framework [in Gaelic] is called crannghail, a word now used in Uist to signify a frail boat.

— Dwelly's [Scottish] Gaelic Dictionary

The currachs in the River Spey were particularly similar to Welsh coracles. Other related craft include:

- India – parisal
- Iraq – quffa or kuphar
- Native American societies – bull boat
- Tibet – ku-dru and kowas
- Vietnam – thúng chai or thuyền thúng

=== Indian coracle ===
Indian coracles (Tamil: பரிசல் parisal; Kannada: ಹರಗೋಲು, ತೆಪ್ಪ, aragōlu, tep, 'crab') are commonly found on the rivers Kaveri and Tungabhadra in Southern India. Coracles are light, bowl-shaped boats with a frame of woven grasses, reeds or saplings covered with hides. Indian coracles are considered to have been in existence since prehistoric times, and are a major tourist attraction at the Hogenakkal falls on the Kaveri river. Although these boats were originally designed for general transport, they have recently been used mostly for giving tourists rides.

==== Types ====
The coracles found in the Hogenakkal are of two types, which differ mainly in size. The smaller ones are about 6.2 feet (1.9 metres) in diameter, and are used primarily for fishing. The larger ones, which measure up to 8.4 feet (2.6 metres) in diameter, are used for tourists.

==== Design ====
Indian coracles are either saucer or bowl shaped and circular, with the greatest diameter across the mouth. The circular coracles in Iraq are very similar, but they have convexly curved sides, and thus the mouth is not the widest part. Indian coracles are on average about 7.3 feet (2.24 metres) in diameter, but can still hold eight people at a time. Other kinds of coracles usually can only hold one person. Indian coracles, and coracles in general, are made of bamboo and take about a day to build, given all the necessary materials. The bottoms of the boats are covered in hides, sometimes with sheets of plastic, or sometimes the bottom is tarred in order to make them waterproof. In modern times, a sheet of LDPE plastic is often embedded between two layers of bamboo. Coracles are steered and propelled using a single paddle from the front of the boat in the direction of travel, making them unique.

==== Construction ====
The boats are made primarily from bamboo. The first step in construction is a basic framework woven from bamboo sticks. Then the bottom is further reinforced with the addition of more bamboo sticks, making the boat's base sturdy. Once the bottom is structurally sound, the lowest points of the sides are defined by a circumferential band of three flat strips of bamboo woven into the existing lattice. The sides of the boat are then made with 20 to 30 adjacent strips of bamboo. Finally this framework is again strengthened by lightweight bamboo, making sure that the sides are not heavier than the base.

The boats had earlier been waterproofed by using hides of animals, but these days plastic sheets are used for this purpose as they are cheaper as well as easily available. The waterproofing is further enhanced by a layer of tar, a feature which is common in most contemporary coracles.

==== Local names ====
- Parisal, sometimes spelt parical – Tamil
- Teppa or harigolu – Kannada
- Putti in Telugu
- Kutta vanchi in Malayalam

=== Iraqi coracle ===
Iraqi coracles, called quffa or kuphar (Arabic: قفة), have been used as ferries, lighters, fishing vessels, and water taxis on the Tigris and Euphrates rivers since at least the 9th century BC. They share details with the myriad types of coracle used across Eurasia. Modern quffas can be up to 18 feet (5.5 m) in diameter and carry four to five tons. Modern quffas are of similar size and construction as their ancient counterparts, with both being made from woven bundles of reeds or basketry waterproofed with bitumen.

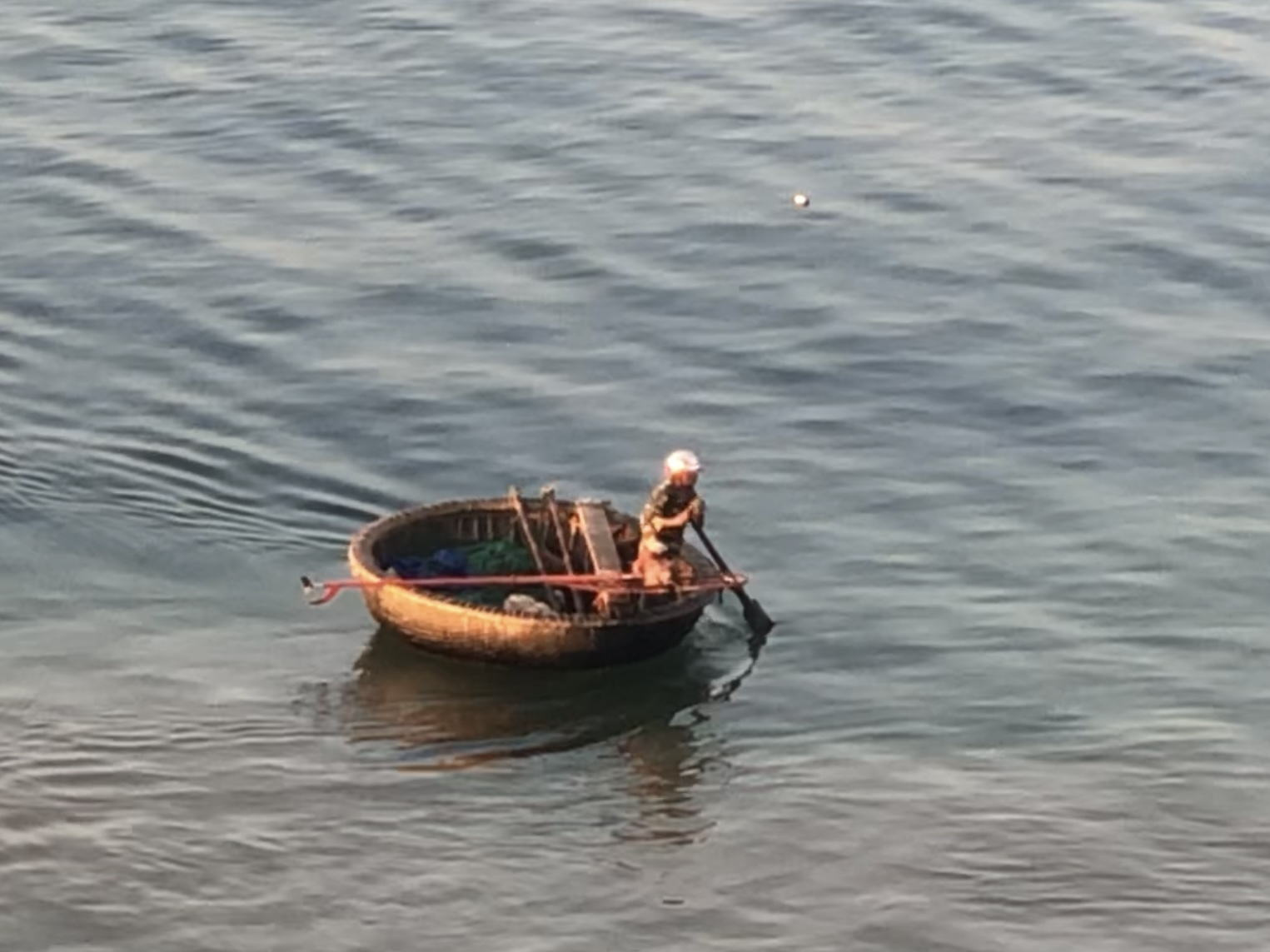
Vietnamese coracle, Vietnam in February, 2019

=== Vietnamese coracle ===
The Vietnamese battle coracle, called thúng chai or thuyền thúng, dated back to the 10th century, is traditionally believed to have been created by a general named Tran Ung Long to be used in battles. However, thuyen thung were probably strongly developed during the French colonial period when the colonialists imposed high taxes on seafaring, local fishermen built coracles to avoid the regulations on boats.

=== Pelota ===
The pelota of South and Central America was a hide vessel similar to a coracle, but it often lacked an internal wooden framework, relying entirely on the stiffness of the hide to stay afloat. Thus it could be carried about on horseback and deployed when there was a river to cross.

== See also ==
- Currach
- Fishing coracle
- Kuphar
- Kayak
- Umiak
- Tarai-bune
