= Bull boat =

Buffalo hide boat used in North America

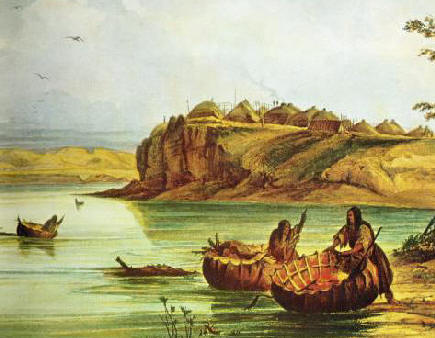
Mandan bull boats. Painting by Karl Bodmer c. 1832

A bull boat is a useful small boat, usually made by the Nueta and frontiersmen, made by covering a skeletal wooden frame with a buffalo hide. It was used for traveling and fishing.

== History ==
When the traders of Hudson's Bay Company first visited the Nueta in 1790 they found that tribe possessed tublike boats with a framework of willow poles, covered with raw buffalo hides. Later, frontiersmen who ascended the Missouri River noted this light, convenient craft. From 1810 to 1830, American fur traders on the tributaries of the Missouri regularly built boats eighteen to thirty feet long, using the methods of construction employed by the Native Americans in making their circular boats. These elongated bull boats were capable of transporting two tons of fur down the shallow waters of the Platte River. These larger boats required joining the buffalo hides with waterproof seams, a technique not used by the American Indians.

== Construction ==
A bull boat's framework was made of willow branches bent in a huge bowl shape about four feet across the top and eighteen inches deep. A bull buffalo hide (thus the bull phrase) was then stretched around this framework. The entire boat weighed about 30 pounds. The hair was left on the hide because it prevented the craft from spinning and aided in keeping the water out. The tails were also kept intact and used to tie numerous bull boats together. Once in the water, it was not very steady because it bobbed around like a cork, but it was serviceable for short trips.

William Clark of the Lewis and Clark Expedition described them thus:

Two sticks of 1-1/4 inch diameter are tied together so as to form a round hoop of the size you wish the canoe to be, or as large as the skin will cover. Two of those hoops are made, one for the top or brim, and the other for the bottom. Then sticks of the same diameter are crossed at right angles and fastened with a thongs to each hoop, and also where each stick crosses the other. Then the skin, when green [fresh, that is, not tanned] is drawn tight over the frame and fastened with thongs to the brim, or outer hoop, so as to form a perfect basin. Pryor's two canoes were nearly the same size, 7 feet 3 inches in diameter and 16 inches deep, with 15 ribs or cross sticks in each.

== Similar vessels ==
A bull boat closely resembles a Welsh coracle, an Irish/Scottish currach, and an Iraqi/Mesopotamian quffa. This similarity was used to support a theory that a Welsh party colonized the New World in the 12th century. However, circular boats of similar design and construction appear in many different regions and do not share a common origin. In fact, these boats are similar solutions to common transportation needs on rivers: ferrying passengers and freight and serving as lighters and fishing boats. Their common design is so widespread because it is easy to make using materials readily available since the Stone Age—wood, animal hide, etc.—and very sturdy and effective.
