= Johnboat =

Flat-bottomed boat

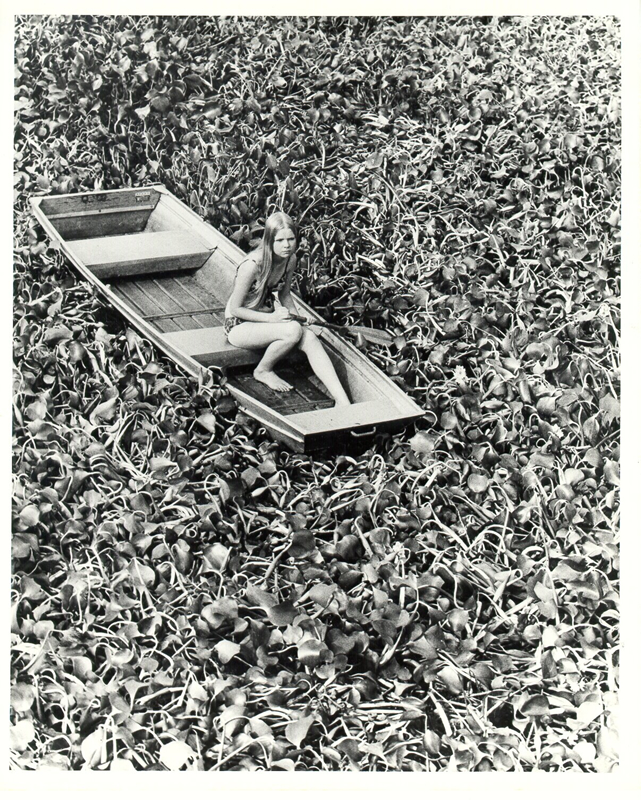
A johnboat in Florida, 1972

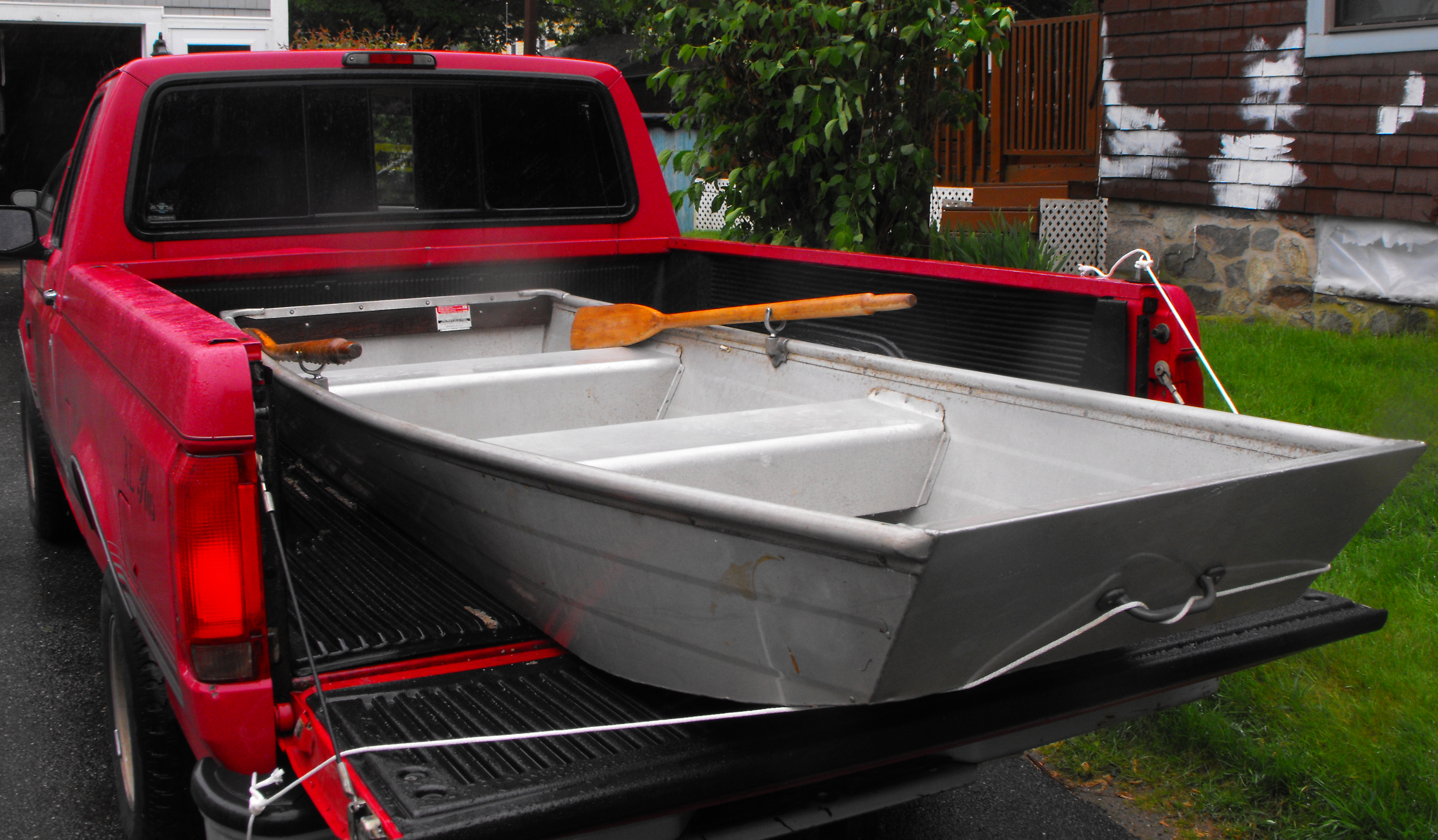
A small modern johnboat in the bed of a pickup truck

A johnboat or jon boat is a flat-bottomed boat constructed of aluminum, fiberglass, wood, or polyethylene with one, two, or three seats, usually bench type. They are suitable for fishing, hunting and cruising. The nearly flat hull of a johnboat tends to ride over the waves rather than cut through them as a V-hull might; this shallow draft—only a few inches—enables the johnboat to operate in very shallow water, but limits its use to calm waters. Johnboats typically have a transom onto which an outboard motor can be mounted. They are simple, easy to maintain, and inexpensive, though with many options to upgrade. Typical options may include live wells/bait wells, side or center consoles, factory-installed decks and floors, electrical wiring, accessory pads/mountings, and casting and poling platforms.

Johnboats are available commercially between 8 and 24 feet (2.4 and 7.3 m) long and 32 to 60 inches (81 to 152 cm) wide, though custom sizes may be found. The design includes an open hull, without a bilge, leaving the ribs exposed. Many users choose to cover the ribs, producing a flat, level surface.

The Wasserwacht branch of the German Red Cross has chosen johnboats for their civil protection units for use during floods.

== History ==
In the late 19th century, flat-bottom boats became popular in the Ozarks, being ideal for traversing the shallow waters in the Missouri Valley.

These vessels were found useful for float fishing, duck hunting and carrying timber. Visiting tourists and travelers enjoyed the idea of flat-bottomed boats, as they could fish standing up and did not have to fear tipping over.
