= Seoighe Inish Bearachain =

Seoighe Inish Bearachain was a name used for three Joyce cousins, John Bhabín Seoighe, Martín Coilín Seoighe and John William Seoighe, who came from the island of Inis Bearachain, Lettermore, in Connemara in County Galway, Ireland. Both John Martín and Martín Cóilín were born on the island of Inish Bearachain (Irish: Inis Bearachain). The third member of the crew, John William, was born on the nearby island of Inis an Ghainimh, but later moved to Inis Bearachain when he married there.

The Seoighe (Joyce) cousins won a number of titles in the All-Ireland currach rowing championships known as the "Tóstal". In the 1950s and early 1960s, the Joyce cousins won a record four All-Ireland titles. This included three consecutive wins in 1956, 1957 and 1958. They also won a fourth All-Ireland race in 1961. To compete in the Tóstal final, teams had to win qualifying races in their own Gaeltacht regions. The Joyce cousins qualified in the Lettermore region and went on to the finals, which were held at Salthill in County Galway.

The 1957 Tóstal final race was rerun because of the disqualification of all the teams except for the one from Clare Island. The Joyce cousins had won this first race, but the Tóstal committee claimed that only the Clare Island team ran the correct race course. After much complaint and debate, the Tóstal committee decided that the race would be rerun in Kilkee, County Clare, in later weeks. The Seoighe cousins won the second race at Kilkee and were presented with the trophy by the then president of Ireland, Éamon de Valera.

During the years the Joyce cousins competed, the main Tóstal race attracted huge crowds, with over 50,000 spectators at Salthill one year. In a time before television, it was a source of entertainment for people, and there was huge interest in the races, which were broadcast on the radio.

== John William Seoighe ==
John William Seoighe (b. 19 February 1919)

John William Seoighe was born on the island of Inse Gaineamh in 1919.

John William Seoighe is also known as an experienced sailor of the traditional boat known as the Galway hooker. John William and John Bhabín Seoighe were both involved in the turf or peat trade to the Aran Islands and County Clare. They used their own boat, Bláth na hÓige (Flower of Youth), to deliver the turf. The turf was loaded into the boats and brought to these areas to use as fuel, but in time lorries supplanted the boats.

In an interview on RTÉ Raidió na Gaeltachta (Irish-language radio), John William was asked by the presenter Máirtín Tom Sheáinín what he thought of the Galway hooker Saint Patrick. His reply became a commonly used saying for any thing or person that looks beautiful: "Ligfeadh an taoile tuile ort a' breathnú uirthi," which translated from Irish means: "One would let the tide come in while looking at it". He has been linked to the phrase ever since.

== Mártín Cóilín Seoighe ==
Mártín Cóilín Seoighe was born on the island of Inis Bearachain. Along with being an oarsman he used to sail in the Galway hooker.

He was a boat builder and built many currachs. He is known as one of the finest wooden oar makers in Ireland. He was the subject of a documentary shown on Irish-language television station TG4, titled "Mé Féin is mo Méit," which translates as "myself and my friend". This documentary showed him with his friend Coleman Coyne and told their stories of their life and times together at sea.

== John Bhabín Seoighe ==
John Bhabín Seoighe (1917 – April 2011) was born on the island of Inis Bearachain. When he married he moved to the mainland of Lettermore.

== Song ==
The "Song of the Joyces", or Amhrán na Seoighe, was written by the poet Val Donnachú from Cárna, Connemara, in praise of the Joyce cousins when they were winning races. A second song was inspired by a rumour there were three black men coming from the United States to compete in the Tóstal.

Amhrán na Seoighe

Ó, chonaic mise fir mhaith le m'aois agus le m'oige
Ní fhaca mé triúr fear a chinnfeadh ar na Seoighe,
Tá bua na tíre anois acu le currachaí is le báid seolta,
Mar chruthaigh siad le honóir é istigh i nGaillimh ag an Tóstal.

Is a Seoighe Inis Bearachain nár laga Dia go deo sibh,
Nach mór an chliú do Ghaillimh is do phobal Leitir Móir sibh,
Mar rinne currach chanbháis ba luaichte ná an ghaoth Mhárta,
'Déanamh míle ins gach nóiméad in aghaidh farraigí 'gus gála.

Ní airím dream ar bith ag caint ach Ciarraí is a naomhóg,
Ach fanaidís sa mbaile is ná tagadís arís ann,
Mar ní fhaca mise triúr fear is ní bréag é seo ná magadh,
Bhí in ann dul chun farraige le Seoighe Chonamara.

Ó ní déarfaidh mé tada eile 'nois ach críochnóidh mé an t-ámhrán,
Nach mór an t-údar onóir é dhá bhfuil ins an deoise,
Ba chóir dhóibh tinte cnámha 'dhéanamh thart timpeall leis na cóstaí,
In ómós do na gaiscígh 'thug an bhratach leo ón tóstal.

== Gallery ==
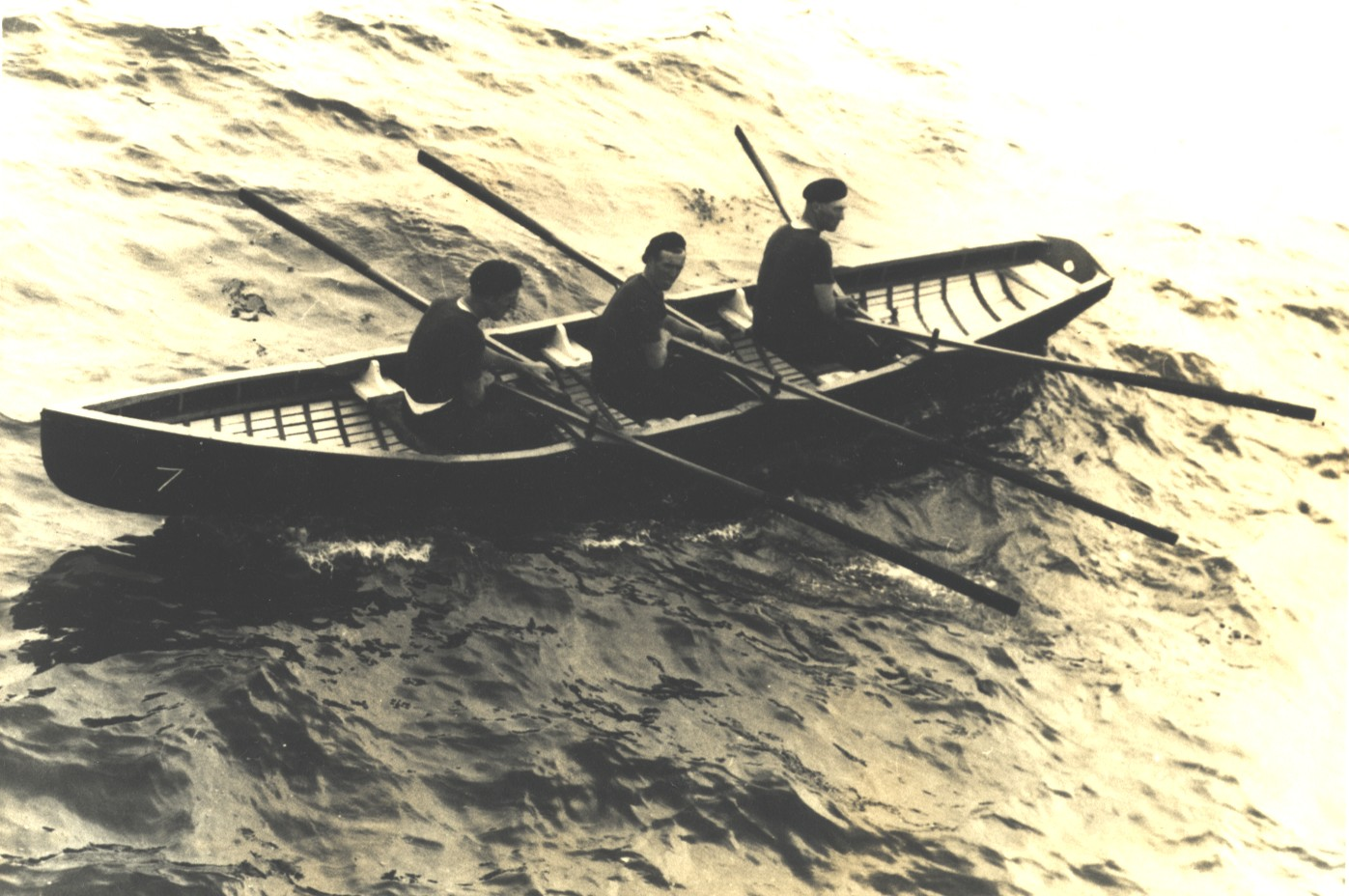
Seoighe cousins after 1956 race, Salthill, Galway

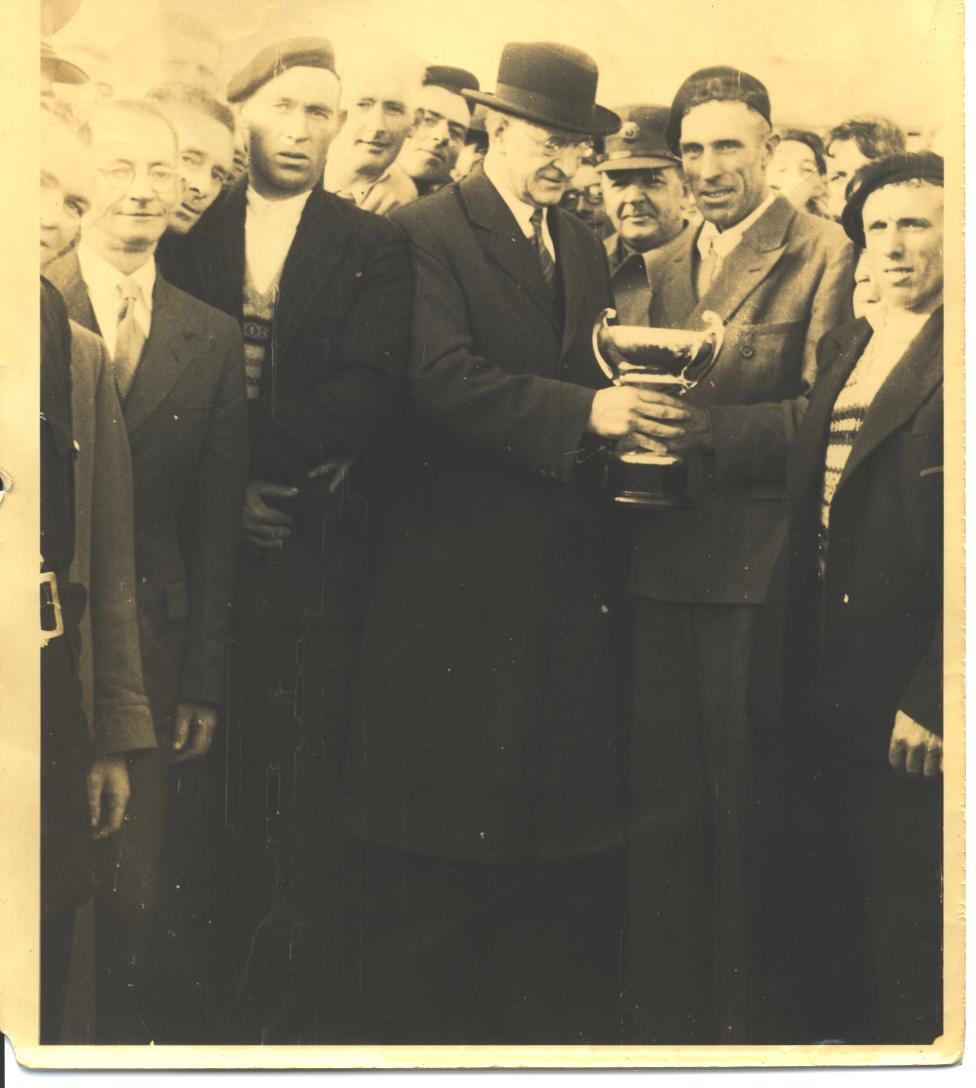
Seoighe cousins, All-Ireland Trophy 1957

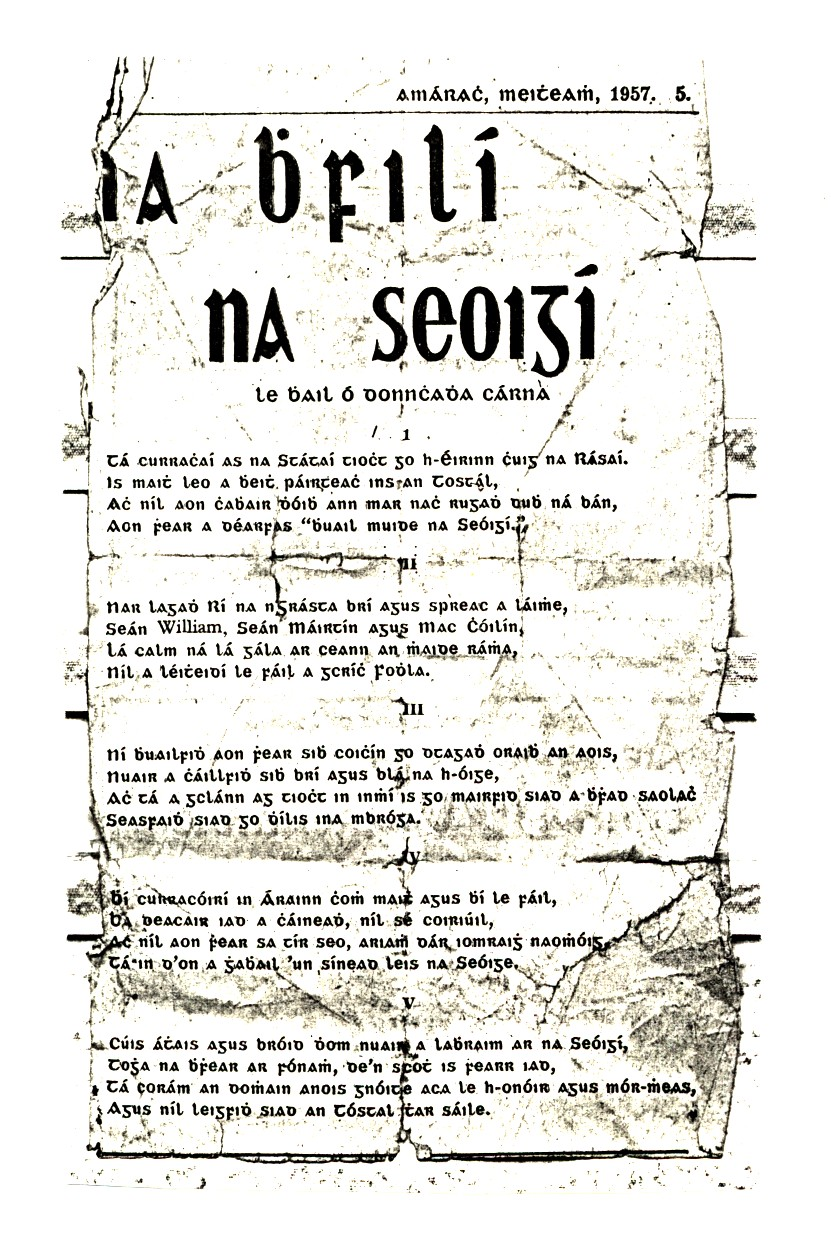
Amhrán na Seoighe
