= Priest (tool) =

Instrument for killing fish or game

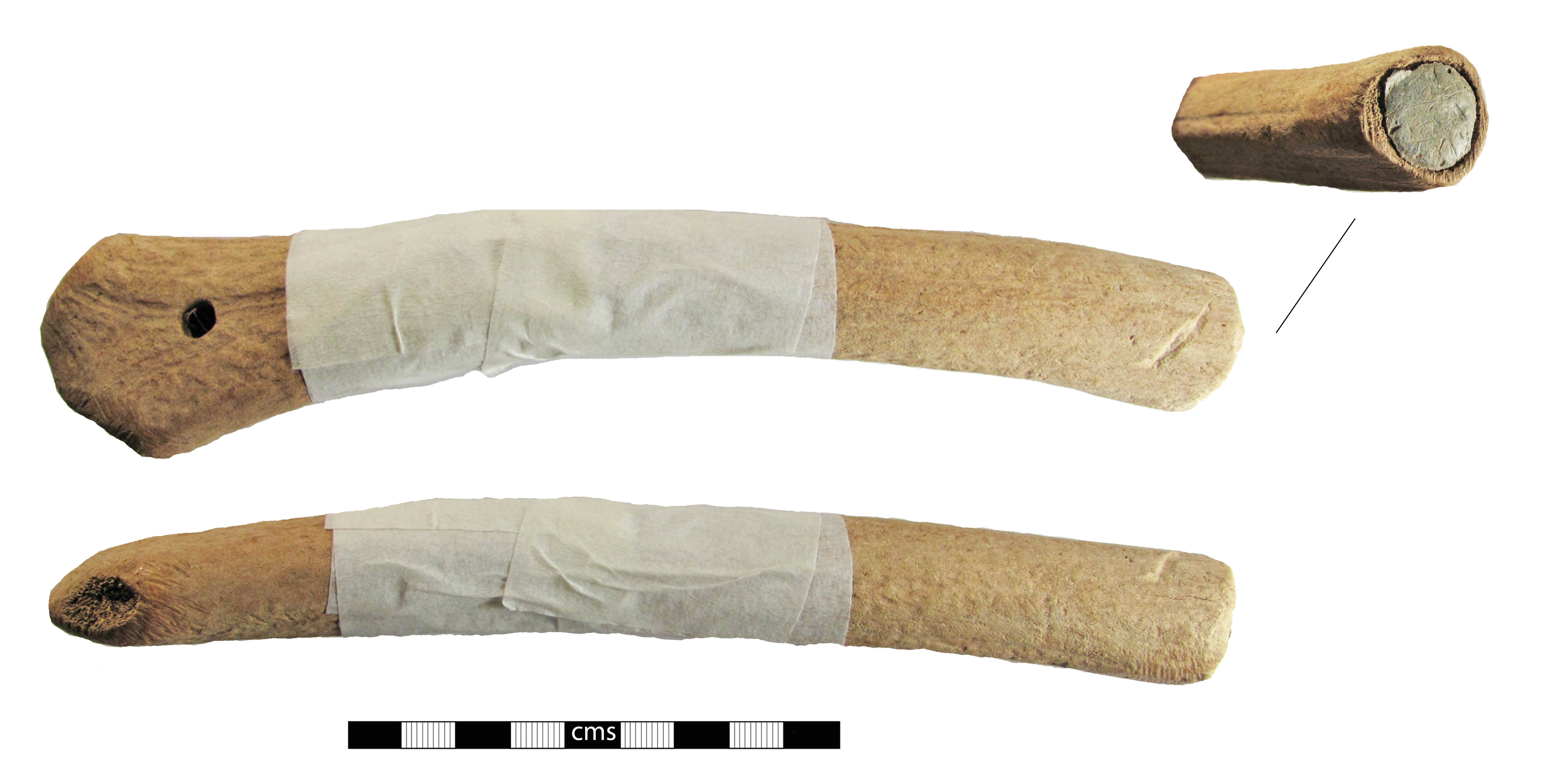
Priest found in Oxfordshire, England.

A priest (also called a poacher's priest, game warden's priest, angler's priest, fish bat or persuader) is a tool for killing game or fish. The name "priest" comes from the notion of administering the "last rites" to the fish or game. Anglers often use priests to quickly kill fish.

== Description ==
Priests usually come in the form of a heavy metal head attached to a metal or wooden stick. The small baton is a blunt instrument used for quickly killing fish or game. Early versions are made of lignum vitae (Latin for "wood of life"), the densest hardwood. One example is described as "Lead filled head. Brass ring to handle. With large Head for dispatching Game. Size overall 14 inches long".
