= Kuphar =

Basket-shaped boat

A kuphar in Baghdad in 1914

A kuphar (also transliterated kufa, kuffah, quffa, quffah, etc.) is a type of coracle or round boat traditionally used on the Tigris and Euphrates rivers in ancient and modern Mesopotamia. Its circular shape means that it does not sail well against the current, as it tends to spin, but makes it safe, sturdy and easy to construct. A kuphar is propelled by paddling, rowing or poling.

== Etymology ==
The word "kuphar" is derived from the Arabic word quffa (قفة), meaning a basket woven from reeds and leaves. The boat visually resembles a basket and is used for a similar purpose: transporting fruits, vegetables, and other goods. The Arabic word in turn originated from the Akkadian word quppu, meaning basket.

== History ==
Reliefs depicting kuphars have been found in Assyrian ruins dating to the reigns of Kings Ashurnasirpal II (883 to 859 BC), Sennacherib (705 to 681 BC), and Ashurbanipal (668 to 627 BC), who reigned during the 9th, 8th, and 7th centuries BC, respectively. A translation of a tablet found by an amateur historian places the kuphar's origin even further in the past, in the Old Babylonian period (c.1830–1531 BC), although this translation is disputed.

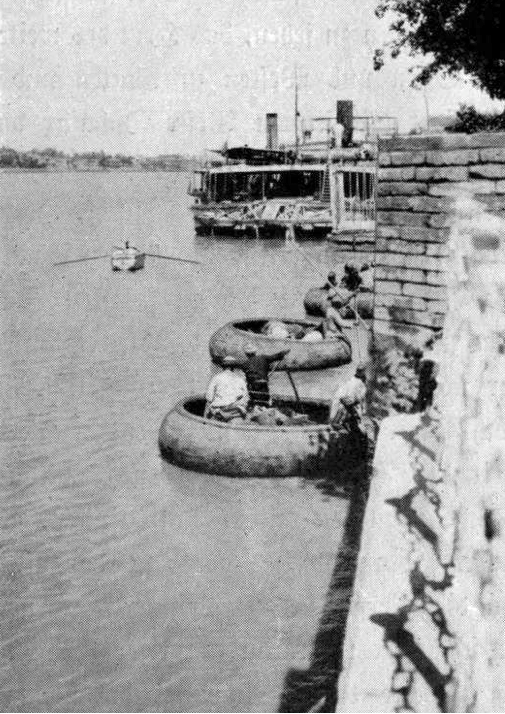
Kuphars moored in Baghdad in 1918

Kuphars were described by Greek historian Herodotus, who visited Babylon around 450 BC:

But that which surprises me most in the land, after the city itself, I will now proceed to mention. The boats which come down the river to Babylon are circular, and made of skins. The frames, which are of willow, are cut in the country of the Armenians above Assyria, and on these, which serve for hulls, a covering of skins is stretched outside, and thus the boats are made, without either stem or stern, quite round like a shield. They are then entirely filled with straw, and their cargo is put on board, after which they are suffered to float down the stream. Their chief freight is wine, stored in casks made of the wood of the palm-tree. They are managed by two men who stand upright in them, each plying an oar, one pulling and the other pushing. The boats are of various sizes, some larger, some smaller; the biggest reach as high as five thousand talents' burthen. Each vessel has a live ass on board; those of larger size have more than one. When they reach Babylon, the cargo is landed and offered for sale; after which the men break up their boats, sell the straw and the frames, and loading their asses with the skins, set off on their way back to Armenia. The current is too strong to allow a boat to return upstream, for which reason they make their boats of skins rather than wood. On their return to Armenia they build fresh boats for the next voyage.

— Herodotus

Five thousand Greek talents would be 143 tons (130 tonnes). This is likely an exaggeration, although carvings of large kuphars carrying cut stones have been found in Assyrian ruins. These large kuphars were propelled by four rowers and relied partially on inflated hide sacks attached port and starboard to stay afloat. More reliable and recent analyses have determined that the largest ancient kuphar measured 18 feet (5.5 m) in diameter and could transport up to 16 tons.

There were two major forms of construction used — hides stretched over a framework, as described by Herodotus, and woven bundles of reeds or basketry, waterproofed with bitumen. Boats of this sort were still used in modern times, being described by British ethnographer James Hornell in The Coracles of the Tigris and Euphrates (1938).

=== Biblical significance ===
A Babylonian cuneiform tablet on display at the British Museum suggests that Noah's Ark may have been a large kuphar. This tablet was translated by professor Irving Finkel and found to contain an ancient flood narrative that may have inspired the story of Noah's Ark. Following his translation, professor Finkel organized the construction of a large vessel of this kind, though he claimed that his 35 tonne ship was a scaled-down version of the full-sized ark. Finkel launched his "ark" in Kerala, India, in 2014, but had difficulty controlling leaks. He attributed the permeability of his double-decker vessel to the low quality of bitumen available in the area.

The tablet describes the flood myth of Atrahasis, a Babylonian hero who built an ark to shelter life from a flood of a divine origin that is thought to have started as a river flood. This ark was, according to the legend described on the tablet, a large kuphar, with either one or two decks, and a total deck area of 14,400 cubits^{2} (3600 m^{2}). Noah's Ark is traditionally described as having a similar deck plan and a nearly identical deck area of 15,000 cubits^{2} (a difference of 4%). This has led Finkel to conclude that "the iconic story of the Flood, Noah, and the Ark as we know it today certainly originated in the landscape of ancient Mesopotamia, modern Iraq."

Some evidence has been found of Neo-Assyrian legends depicting infants being cast adrift in kuphars on the river, similar to how baby Moses was cast adrift in a basket in the Book of Exodus. This has led some scholars to conclude that the basket that Moses was set adrift in on the Nile may have in fact been a kuphar.

== Modern use ==
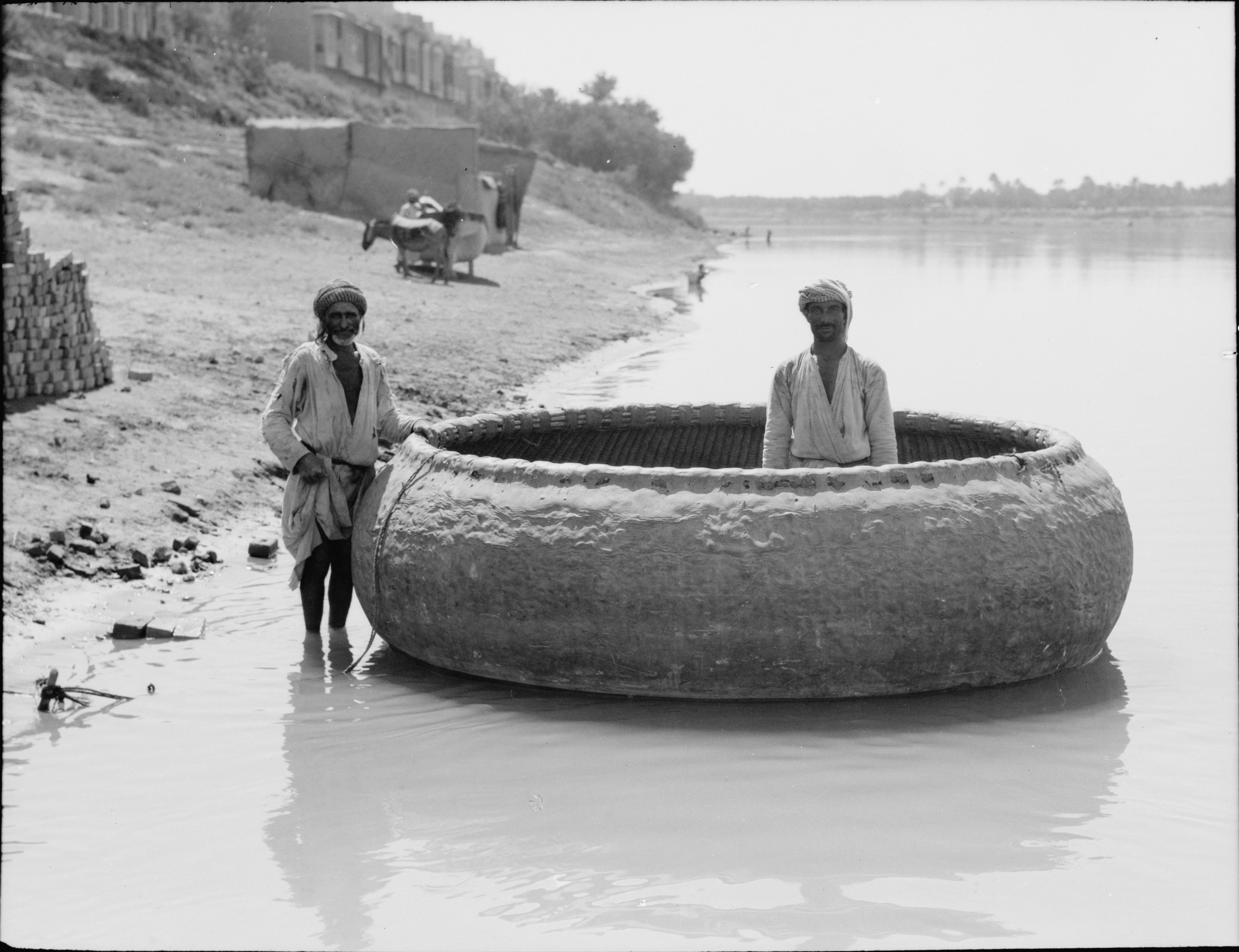
Kuphar in Baghdad in 1932

Kuphars remained in widespread use as water taxis, lighters, fishing boats, and ferries in early 20th century Iraq, especially around Baghdad. These vessels are typically 4.5–10 feet (1.4–3 meters) wide at the opening and have drafts of 2.5–4 feet (0.8–1.2 meters) and freeboards of 6–8 inches (15–20 cm) fully loaded. They typically transport four to five people although they can carry up to 20. Larger kuphars can transport four to five tons, equivalent to three horses, several people, and other assorted cargo. The largest one measured in the 20th century had an opening 16.4 feet (5.0 m) in diameter, although due to the tumblehome nature of the kuphar's hull, its diameter overall was 18 feet (5.5 m).

Kuphar use declined following the development of the automobile and the widespread construction of roads and bridges across modern Iraq. However, they could still be seen around Iraq until the 1970s.

Modern kuphars are made of woven bundles of reeds waterproofed with bitumen, as in ancient times. James Hornell described them thus:

... the craft likened in form to the Tibetan food-bowl—perfectly circular in plan, nearly flat bottomed, and with convexly curved sides that tumble-home to join the stout cylindrical gunwale bounding the mouth, which is several inches less in diameter than the width at mid height. In construction a quffa is just a huge lidless basket, strengthened within by innumerable ribs radiating from around the centre of the floor. The type of basketry employed is of that widely distributed kind termed coiled basketry.

— James Hornell

Tennyson referenced the boats in his 1827 poem Persia,

On fair Diarbeck's land of spice,
Adiabene's plains of rice,
Where down th' Euphrates, swift and strong,
The shield-like kuphars bound along;

— Alfred, Lord Tennyson

== Similar vessels ==
The kuphar's similarity to other circular boats has been noted by many authors. This is not a coincidence: Hornell, Marie-Christine De Graeve, and other ethnographers and anthropologists believe that the kuphar is the common ancestor of the coracles that are widely used across Eurasia, particularly in the British Isles and South and Southeast Asia. However, the similar Irish currach was independently developed by the ancient Celts.

== See also ==
- Fishing coracle
- Kayak
- Umiak
