= James Hornell =

English zoologist and seafaring ethnographer

James Hornell (1865 – February 1949) was an English zoologist and seafaring ethnographer. He was a cousin of Edward Atkinson Hornel, a Scottish painter.

== Career ==
As a zoologist Hornell published a number of papers on marine organisms working most notably with his father in law Joseph Sinel in Jersey, and in 1900 traveled to Ceylon (now Sri Lanka) to report on the pearl fisheries. Staying there for six years, Hornell published a number of papers on the pearling industry. While there he was elected a Fellow of the Linnean Society for his work on marine worms. After working for several more years in India, organizing the fisheries of Madras, he retired, and thus began his next career as an ethnographer of seafarming and maritime life. He traveled extensively around the Indian Ocean world and east Asia, making records of indigenous watercraft, sailing on Junks and Sampans, and as a member of an expedition to the south seas made many records of the watercraft of Polynesia. Further travels brought encounters with watercraft of northern India, the Mediterranean, the Nile, Uganda, Madagascar, Iraq, and northern Europe.

Hornell was the Scientific Director of the St George expedition to the South Pacific which took place in 1924-1925.

In the 1930s became the principal authority on traditional, indigenous watercraft particular logboats, skin boats, canoes of all types, floats and even small ships. His work is distinguished by careful observation and measurement and supported by drawings and photographs of seafaring life all but vanished over the second half of the twentieth century.

James Hornell also collected string games. He collected string figures from Africa, Asia and Pacifics Islands.

== Published works ==
Among his publications are:

- James Hornell (1914). The sacred Chank of India: A monograph of the Indian Conch (Turbinella pyrum) - Online Book. The Superintendent, Government Press, Madras.
- String Figures from Fiji and Western Polynesia (1927)
- The String Games and Tricks of Sierra Leone (1928)
- Cat's Cradles, the World's Most Widespread Game (1928)
- String Figures from Sierra Leone, Libera, and Zanzibar (1930)
- The Cypriote Threshing Sledge (1930)
- String Figures from British New Guinea (1932)
- String Figures from Gujarat and Kathiawar (1932)
- Indonesian Influence in East African Culture (1934)
- Report on the Fisheries of Palestine (1934). A brochure which describes first attempts of growing common carp in Palestine.
- British Coracles and Irish Currachs with a note on the Guffah of Iraq (1938 as a book from Society for Nautical Research, previously a series of articles in their journal).
- String Figures from Anglo-Egyptian Sudan (1940)
- String Figure Diffusion (1943)
- The Canoes of Polynesia, Fiji and Micronesia;
- The Fishing Luggers of Hastings; and
- Water Transport: Origins and Early Evolution.
- "Water Transport"
- Sinhalese String Figures and Tricks (1999)
- String Figures from Burma (1999)
