= St. Ayles Skiff =

Rowing boat

St. Ayles Skiff Prototype Chris o'Kanaird off Anstruther

The St. Ayles Skiff (pronounced Saint Isles) is a 4 oared rowing boat, designed by Iain Oughtred and inspired by the traditional Fair Isle skiff. The boat’s hull and frames are built using clinker plywood and it measures 22’ with a beam of 5’ 8”. It is normally crewed by four sweep rowers with a coxswain.

The boat design was commissioned by The Scottish Fisheries Museum in 2009 as a vessel for use in The Scottish Coastal Rowing Project. It is suitable for construction by community groups and amateur boat builders.

Over 250 boats have been built worldwide, mostly by communities around the Scottish coast but increasingly by groups elsewhere, including England, Northern Ireland, The Netherlands, the United States, Canada, Australia, South Africa, France and New Zealand.

== St Ayles Skiff Origin ==
In 2009 as part of The Scottish Fisheries Museum’s strategy to stimulate boat-building activities, discussions were held with Jordan Boats to develop a new kit. Alec Jordan and Museum Trustees were inspired by the community involvement and participation in the historical tradition of Fife miners’ rowing and sailing regattas and looked to develop a boat that could engage communities in the same way. It was proposed that The Scottish Fisheries Museum develop a project to re-introduce coastal rowing to the Fife Coast, so with the aid of funding from Museums Galleries Scotland, the Scottish Fisheries Museum commissioned designer Ian Oughtred to produce a new design based on, the Fair Isle Yoal. North Berwick rower and enthusiast Robbie Wightman had, simultaneously, considered a similar scheme and supported the development of the project to spread beyond Fife to become a national initiative. The Scottish Coastal Rowing Project was subsequently launched by the Scottish Fisheries Museum with the intention of re-starting the moribund inter-community rowing competitions, which had formerly taken place between the coastal towns in Fife, the Lothians and elsewhere around the Scottish coastline. The Project sought to re-connect coastal communities with the sea by encouraging the communities themselves to build their own rowing boats, which would then be rowed socially and in competition.

== Design and construction ==
The design of the St. Ayles skiff is inspired by the traditional Fair Isle skiffs, small and relatively lightweight fishing vessels suitable for use in rough sea conditions. The name is a reference to the medieval St. Ayles chapel, which stood on the site of The Scottish Fisheries Museum in Anstruther.

With a double-ended hull and relatively wide beam the St. Ayles skiff is a stable and seaworthy boat. The marine plywood planks and frames can be purchased in kit form, together with a plywood mould upon which the hull can be formed. Other parts of the boat, including the rudder, seats (thwarts), keel and gunwales, may be built using suitable timbers. Most of the timber elements, including the planking and frames, are jointed and connected using either epoxy resin or Polyurethane glue.

Oars for the St. Ayles skiff must be built using timber and, for competitive use, must not be spooned or asymmetrical. The original designs show oars of 12' length but builders may experiment with alternative designs and lengths. Metal rowing pins or rowlocks are not allowed in competitions.

== St Ayles Skiff Class Associations ==
The first prototype boat (Chris o’ Kanaird) was supplied by the kit manufacturer Jordan Boats and launched in October 2009. By May 2010 five more boats had been built by communities around Scotland and the first St Ayles Skiff Regatta, which was attended by all six boats, was held in Anstruther on 29 May.

The Scottish Coastal Rowing Association (SCRA) was formally constituted as the class association for the developing sport at the first Anstruther Regatta. The Association subsequently became a Scottish Charitable Incorporated Organisation and is now the governing body for fixed seat rowing in Scotland, as well as retaining its role as a class association. SCRA continues to encourages community involvement in the construction and rowing of the St. Ayles skiff and maintains a Craft Register.

In October 2013 the St. Ayles Skiff was adopted for use by The New Zealand Coastal Rowing Association, the first such Association to be formally established outside Scotland.

In 2019 St Ayles Skiff International (SASI) was formed as the international class association for the St Ayles Skiff. It came about as a result of agreement between four national class associations (Scottish Coastal Rowing Association, Dutch St Ayles Rowing Association, Down Coastal Rowing Association and St Ayles Skiff Community Rowing Association of Australia). SASI took over responsibility for the international measurement rules from SCRA. SASI is also responsible now for determining where the St Ayles skiff World championships are held.

== Regattas and World Championships ==
The number of events for St. Ayles Skiffs has grown quickly and internationally since 2010 and many coastal communities now host their own inter-club racing regattas and social events.

Competitive events often include several categories, with races for varying age groups and for novices, encouraging wider community involvement. Race types have ranged from very short pursuit-style events to mass-start races over several kilometers.

St. Ayles Skiffs have also been rowed in multi class events including The Great River Race, Ocean to City in Cork, The Great Tyne Row, Voga Longa, Castle to Crane (River Clyde) and The Thames Diamond Jubilee Pageant.

In July 2013 the Scottish Coastal Rowing Association, together with local rowing clubs based on Loch Broom, hosted the first St Ayles Skiff World Championships in Ullapool. The event was attended by over 30 clubs from Scotland, England, the Netherlands, The United States and Tasmania and was formally opened by The Princess Royal. Racing, which took place over several days, was held over a 2Km 15 lane course laid out on Loch Broom. In keeping with the spirit of Scottish Coastal Rowing the event also included a significant social element, allowing participants from the communities attending to meet and socialise together.

In July 2016 the Strangford Lough and Lecale Partnership, Scottish Coastal Rowing Association, Newry, Mourne and Down District Council and Ards and North Down Borough Council, together with local rowing clubs based on Strangford Lough and the Ards Peninsula hosted “Skiffie Worlds 2016”. The event was attended by 50 clubs from Scotland, England, Northern Ireland, the Netherlands, The United States, Canada and Tasmania. Racing took place over a 2 km course on Strangford Lough at Delamont Country Park. The 2016 worlds were won by Dundrum Coastal Rowing Club, an affiliated club of Down Coastal Rowing Association

SkiffieWorlds 2019 was held in Stranraer from 7 – 13 July 2019. The event was hosted on Loch Ryan and competed by 2,000 crew members representing 200 teams, a further 710 crew support members and it is estimated that between 25,000 and 30,000 spectators attended the event. Scotland, England, Northern Ireland, Holland, Canada, USA, Tasmania, South Africa and the Republic of Ireland were all represented by clubs. Dundrum were the winning club with Sketrick second and Eastern third.

SkiffieWorlds 2022 was held at Kortgene in the Netherlands from 25 June - 2 July 2022. As in the 2019 championship Sketrick were the early leaders eventually overtaken by the eventual winners Dundrum on the final day the top eight results being used to decide the championship, Eastern taking the third spot.
