= Nordland (boat) =

Type of fishing boat

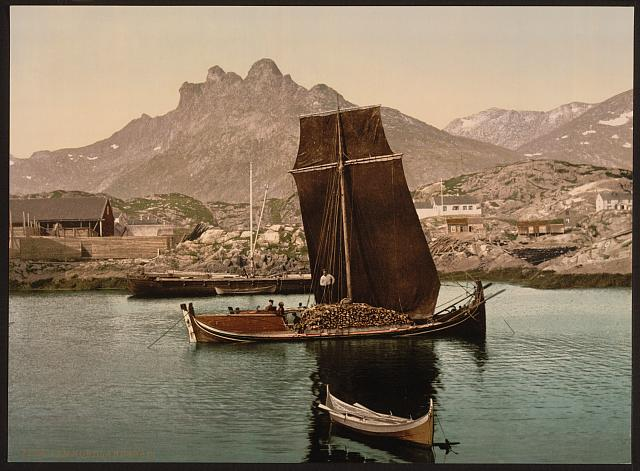
Two Nordland boats, the larger one sitting low in the water, loaded with a hold of timber or fish, most likely stockfish. Photo from between 1890 and 1900.

The Nordland boat (or Norwegian: Nordlandsbåt), is a type of fishing boat that has been used for centuries in northern counties of Nordland, Troms and Finnmark of Norway and derives its name from Nordland county where it has a long history. It has dominated the Lofoten and Vesterålen islands fishing industry for centuries and is closely related to the old Viking longships.

== Construction ==
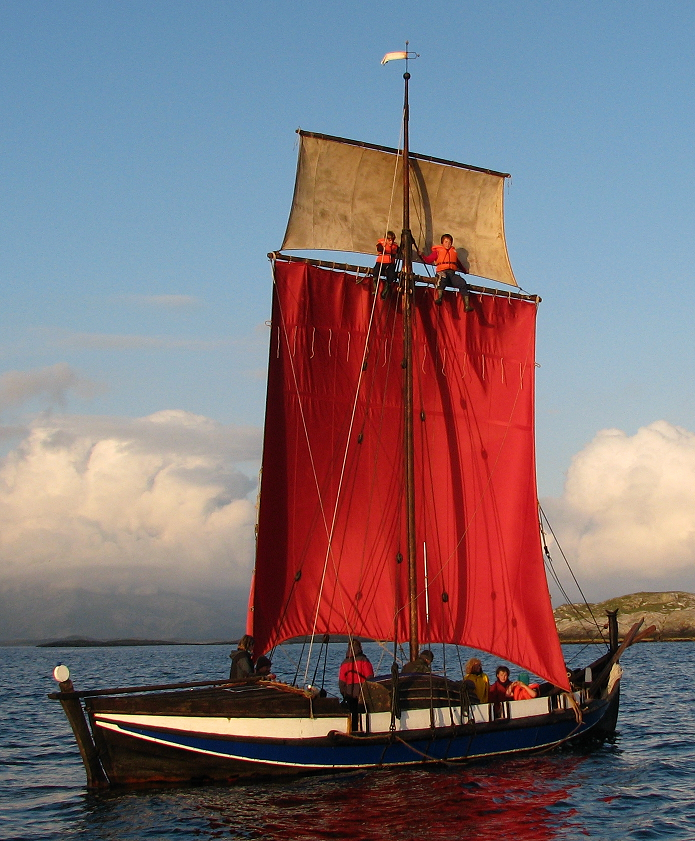
Traditional Norwegian Nordland boat near Kvitvær (Lurøy, Nordland)

The Nordland boat has a clinker, or lapstrake hull design and has its rudder on the sternpost. Its length varies from 14 to well over 40 feet and usually has a length to beam ratio of 3–1 to 4–1. It has a high prow and stern, shallow keel, v-hull and has an inboard gunwale, which can be used to drain off the fishing nets when they are drawn on board. Some of the larger Nordlanders have a detachable cabin that is used for shelter, often having a wood-burning stove inside.

The Nordlander normally carries a large single square sail with the largest boats carrying a topsail. It's one of the few types of boats that still carries such a sail to the present day.

Oak had been a favorite wood for ship builders for centuries for its resistance to rot, strength, and durability. However, oak is not native to Norway north of the county of Trøndelag and is also a heavy wood which would make such boats difficult to pull up on shore, which was done on a daily basis. For these reasons, the materials used for the Nordland is almost exclusively pine, and in the northern regions, spruce. Pine and spruce are lighter woods which would make it easier to be drawn up on shore, but at the expense of durability.

== Sami versions ==
The Nordland boat has a very long history in the north Norwegian coastline, with both Norwegians and Sami, who are first recorded as sailing such boats from about 950 onwards. Around 1000 AD the Sami were described as producing Nordlandbots for their Norwegian customers along the northern coastal farming communities, which the Norwegians soon started to build for themselves.

One of the biggest differences between the Norwegian and Sami built Nordlands is that the Sami 'sewed' the lapstrakes together using reindeer intestines, while the Norwegians used iron rivets. Nordland boats continued to be built for over 1,000 years, and in the early 20th century it was still used for fishing and coastal transport.

The coat-of-arms of Nordland County, Norway is from modern times (1965).

== Unique feature ==
One of the unique features of the Nordland is its ballast system. Dozens of fist size round rocks are placed at the bottom of the boat to keep the boat weighted down. If the boat is either swamped or capsizes, then the rocks are designed to roll out of the boat which would lighten the boat and thus keep it afloat.

== The Nordland Boat today ==
Nordland boats today are no longer used as primarily fishing boats but as pleasure craft and have annual races. The coat-of-arms of Nordland County shows the traditional boat - the Nordlandsbåt.
