= Stem (ship) =

Vertical continuation of the keel at the front of a boat

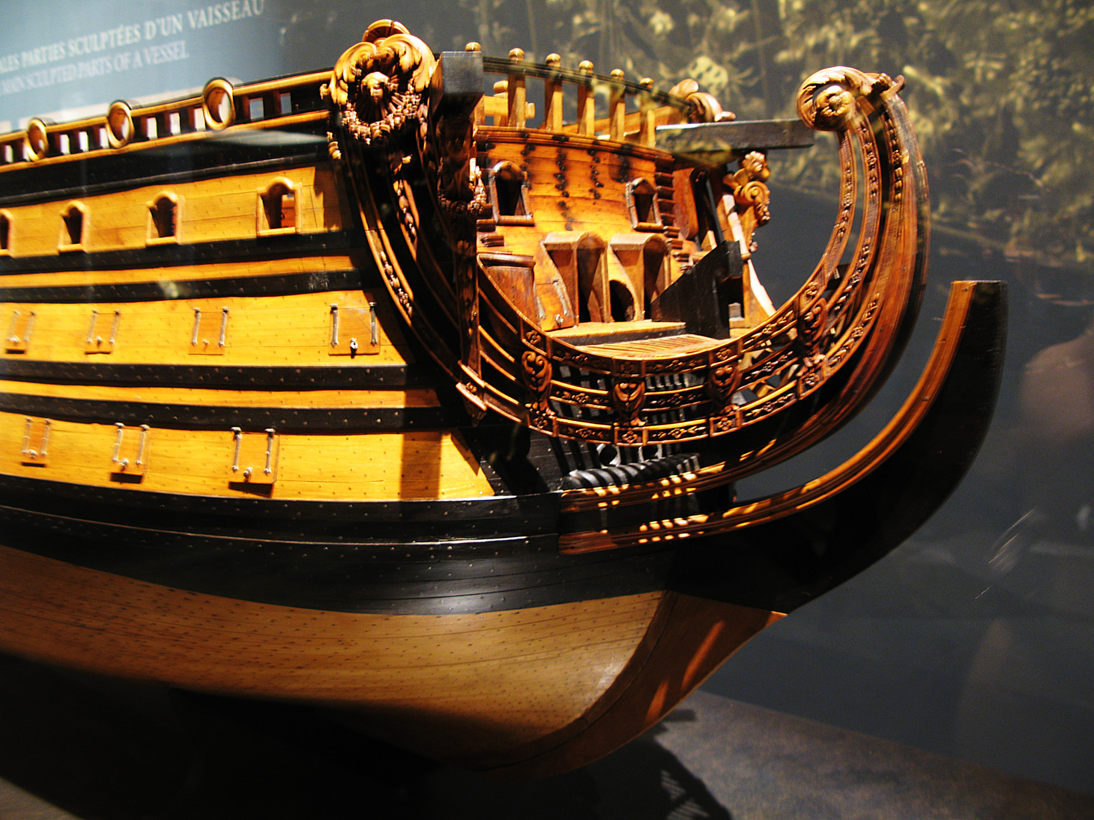
A model of the French ship Soleil Royal held at the Musée National de la Marine de Paris. The most forward and lowest curved part of the ship is the stem (not normally the extended part beyond the hull).

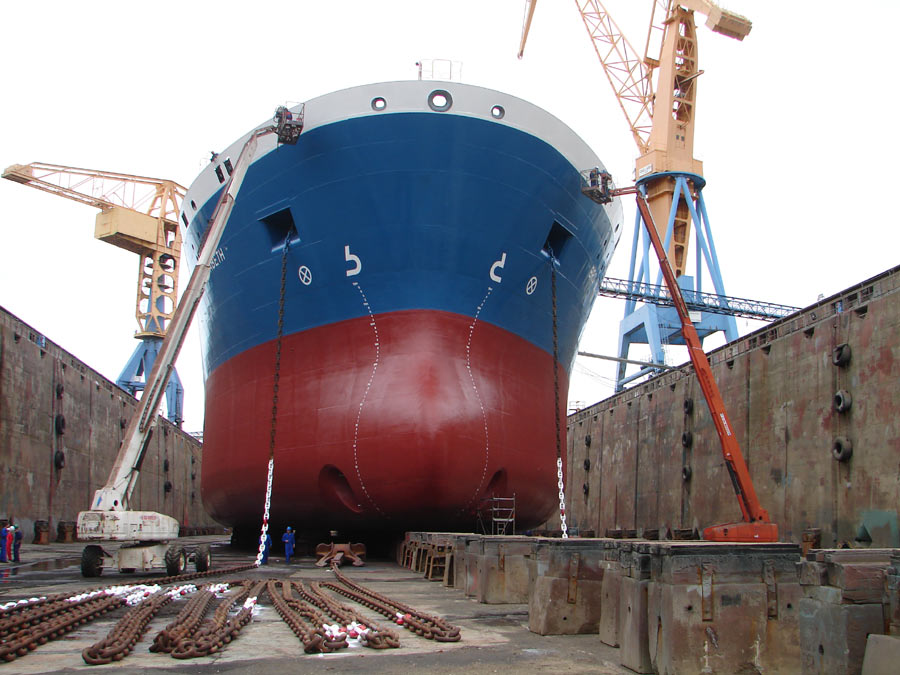
The bow of the oil and chemical tanker Bro Elizabeth in dry dock in Brest, France. This ship does not have a stem.

The stem is the most forward part of a boat or ship's bow and is an extension of the keel itself. It is often found on wooden boats or ships, but not exclusively.

== Description ==
The stem is the curved edge stretching from the keel below, up to the gunwale of the boat. It is part of the physical structure of a wooden boat or ship that gives it strength at the critical section of the structure, bringing together the port and starboard side planks of the hull.

== Plumb and raked stem ==
There are two styles of stems: plumb and raked. When the stem comes up from the water, if it is perpendicular to the waterline it is "plumb". If it is inclined at an angle to the waterline it is "raked". (For example, "The hull is single decked and characterized by a plumb stem, full bows, straight keel, moderate deadrise, and an easy turn of bilge.")

== Stemhead ==
Because the stem is very sturdy, the top end of it may have something attached, either ornamental or functional in nature. On smaller vessels, this might be a simple wood carving (ornamental) or cleat (functional). On large wooden ships, figureheads can be attached to the upper end of the stem.

== See also ==
- Beakhead
- Bow
- Deadwood
- Prow
- V-hull (boat)
