= Yoal =

Type of boat

The yoal (Shaetlan pronunciation: [joɐɫ] YOHL), often referred to as the ness yoal, is a clinker-built craft used traditionally in Shetland, Scotland. It is designed primarily for rowing, but also handles well under its traditional square sail when running before the wind or on a broad reach.

The word yoal is a variant of yawl.

== Construction ==
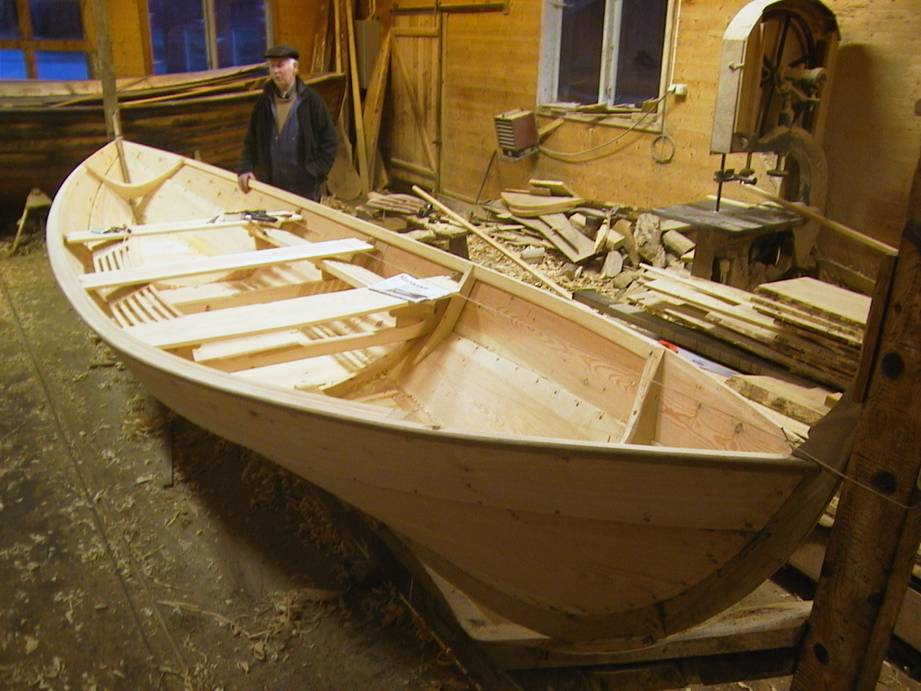
Oselvar under construction

Until about 1860, yoals were imported in kit form from the area around Bergen in Norway. The traditional small wooden boats were known as either Strandebarmer or Oselvar from Os Municipality in Hordaland, Norway. The wooden boats were taken apart and then 'flat packed' for shipping to the Shetland Islands. Instead of sending complicated assembly instructions, they sent Norwegian boatbuilders to re-build them. However, increasing customs duty meant that Shetland builders took over the building but stayed mostly with the original Norwegian design. However, the Ness yoal is better regarded as a successful and sophisticated adaptation for the specific local requirements of the fishermen where these vessels were used which was Dunrossness, the southernmost parish of Mainland.

All the parts of a yoal have a name, perhaps to make assembly easier when they came in kit form, or to make it easier to order spare parts. In many cases, the names of the parts bear a closer relationship to Norwegian than British usage. The descriptive text on this page names most of these parts.

There are six boards to the construction of a yoal; they are, from the keel up: the gabbard straik; the Hassen Straik; the lower sool; the upper sool; the sand straik, and the upper wup.

The boards are fixed to three main frames baands which curve across the keel between gunwales, underneath the tafts (seats), and also to the stammerin or cant frame, near both bow and stern, before attaching to the fore and aft stems. The upper wups are joined by the hinny spot where they meet the horn, at the top of the stem, for added strength.

The baands are not fixed to the keel, this again adding to the flexibility of the yoal.

The baands divide the boat into four sections: the fore room, for fishing tackle etc.; the mid room, for ballast; the owsin room, which was kept clear for bailing (owsin meaning any water which came aboard, bailed with an owsekerri); and the shot room, which is where the catch was stored.

To save the gunwales from wear, at each aer, (oar), position a block of hard wood, the routh, is fixed in position with two wooden pegs called routh pins. Sticking up from the routh is the kabe, a hardwood peg, against which the oar is rowed. The oar is held in position against the kabe by a loop of rope called the humlieband.

One notable feature of yoal construction are the gunwales which stop short at both bow and stern leaving several inches of upper board with no gunwale. This is supposed to give the craft more flexibility in heavy seas.

The yoal was typically rowed by three men with a pair of oars each. The men were seated on tafts, which rested on the wearin (a wooden support which ran across the three main baands), and for purchase they could brace their feet against a fitlinn, a piece of wood across between the baands. The floorboards of the boat were called tilfers.

When wind conditions were suitable, a yoal carried a square sail, hoisted on a wooden mast which was stepped through the mid taft and braced at its base to the mid baand.

== History ==
The yoal was the main vessel used for haaf (open water within sight of land, up to 10 miles from shore) fishing for cod, ling and tusk until the fish shoals moved further offshore at the end of the 17th century, probably due to climatic change. Although yoals were not designed for the far haaf, Shetland fishermen continued to use them for relatively deep sea fishing with attendant accidents and loss of life until the introduction in the mid 18th century of the larger, heavier and deeper sixareen designed for fishing further offshore. Although there were some variations in size the yoal was generally 21 ft 5in overall, 15 ft keel, 21in inside depth amidships and 5 ft 5in beam.

George Johnson of Skelberry, Dunrossness, was one of the most prolific builders of ness yoals. Among the yoals built by Johnson, in his later years, were several larger ones up to 23 ft 10in overall. One of these, which has now gone, was the Oceans Gift, so named because all the wood for her construction came from driftwood. Unusual features of these larger yoals were that their gunwales did not stop short of the stem and stern like the normal yoals, and some of them had a full fourth 'baand'.

== Present day ==
Throughout Shetland many traditional yoals, built by Johnson, and others of his era, still exist. Very few are still in regular use, although in the Virkie Marina there are 2 which are used for pleasure fishing.

In recent years the advent of yoal rowing regattas has seen an upsurge in the building of these traditional craft.

Ian Best of Fair Isle, and Tommy Isbister of Trondra, are contemporary yoal builders.

== See also ==
- Faering
- Oselvar
- Yole (a similar craft found in the Orkneys)
