= Yawl =

Type of boat

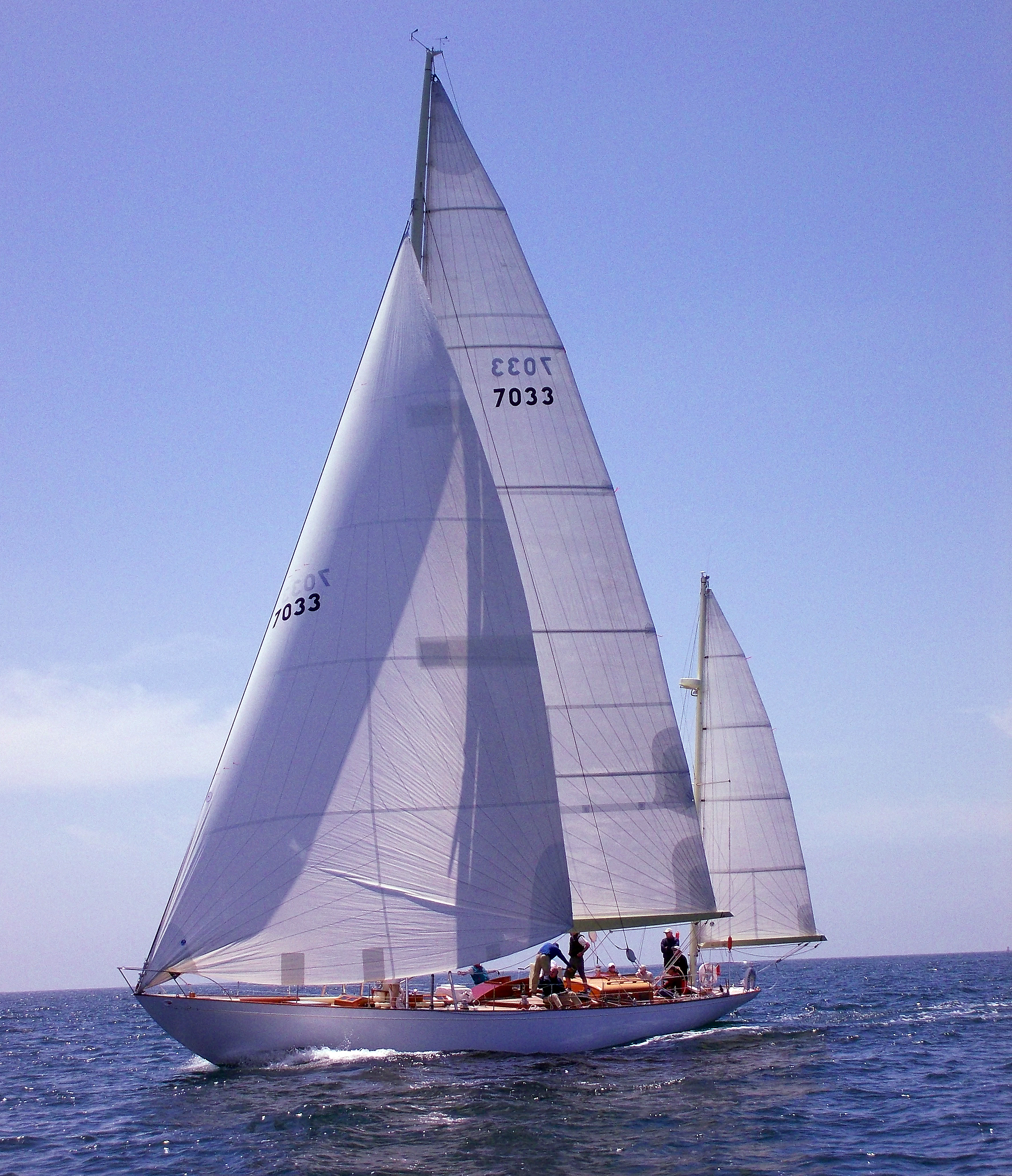
A yawl setting a genoa, main, and mizzen

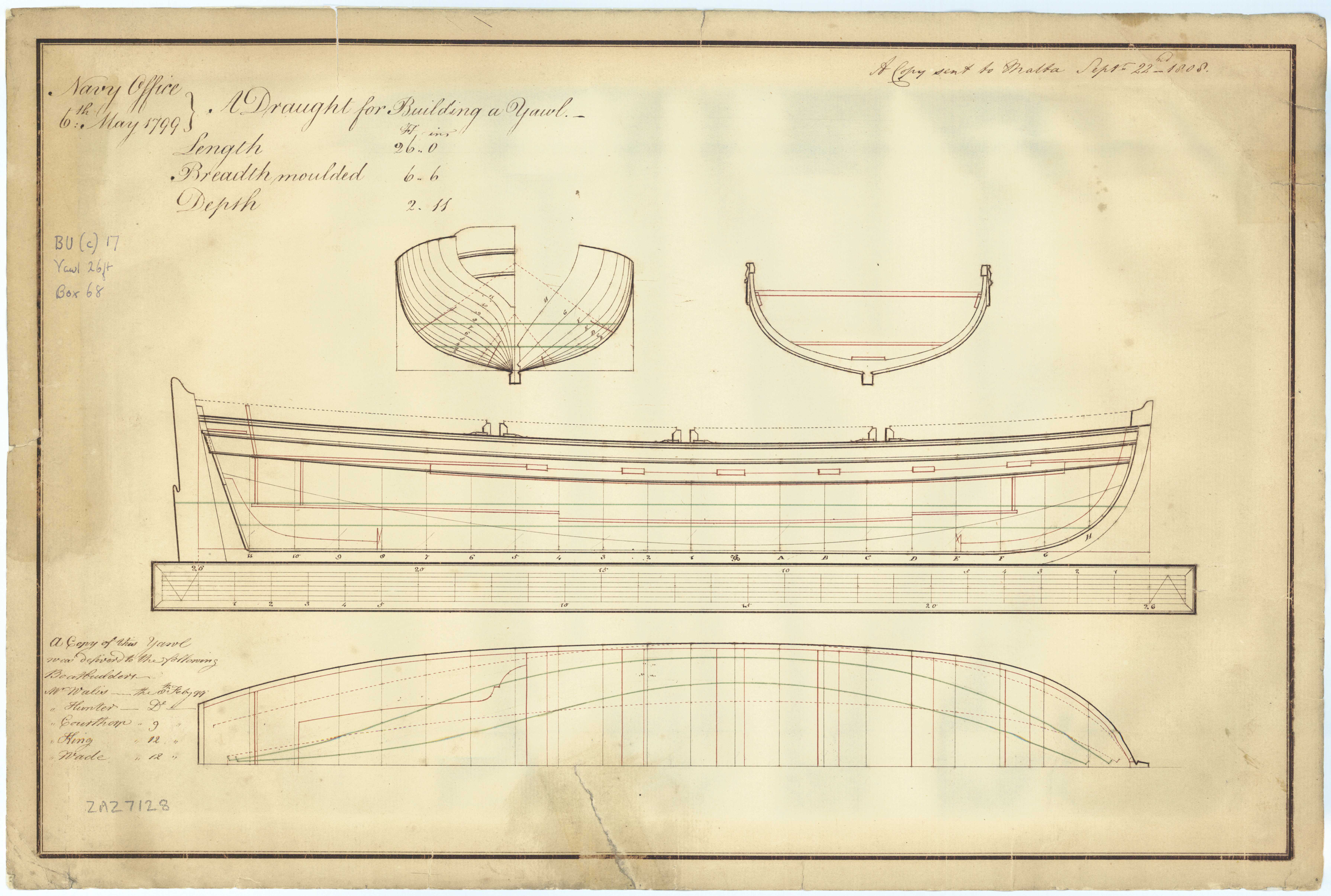
The lines plan of a Royal Navy 26 ft (7.9 m) yawl, dated 1799. The transom stern differentiates this type from the double-ended, clinker-built working craft.

A yawl is a type of boat. The term has several meanings. It can apply to the rig (or sailplan), to the hull type or to the use which the vessel is put.

As a rig, a yawl is a two-masted, fore-and-aft-rigged sailing vessel with the mizzenmast positioned abaft (behind) the rudder stock, or in some instances, very close to the rudder stock. This is different from a ketch, where the mizzen mast is forward of the rudder stock. The sail area of the mizzen on a yawl is consequently proportionately smaller than the same sail on a ketch.

As a hull type, yawl may refer to many types of open, clinker-built, double-ended, traditional working craft that operated from the beaches of Great Britain and Ireland. These boats are considered to be linked to the Viking or Nordic design tradition. Most of these types are now extinct, but they include the Norfolk and Sussex Beach Yawls (called "yols" by the men who crewed them), which were probably the fastest-sailing open boats ever built.

A yawl is also a type of ship's boat. The definition, size, number of oars and sailing rig varied over time. This was one of the normal working boats carried by a ship in the age of sail.

In local usage, the term yawl was sometimes applied to working craft which did not fit any of the definitions given above. An example of this is the Whitstable yawl, a decked gaff-cutter-rigged fishing smack that dredged for oysters.

The etymology of "yawl" is obscure, especially considering the different meanings of the word.

== The sailing rig ==
=== Origins ===
Yawl rigs appear to have originated in the early 19th century. Working craft of this type include the later versions of the Falmouth Quay Punt. Dixon Kemp, an authority on yacht racing, became interested in this local type in 1875. Yachts were rigged as yawls as early as 1814. John MacGregor had his 1867-built Rob Roy designed as a yawl. (MacGregor had a number of boats, all of the same name.) British and European racing yachts were rigged as yawls from the second half of the 1870s, with a resurgence in popularity from 1896, when a change to the handicap rating system gave advantages to yawls. They remained prominent in handicap classes through the 1920s, with yachts like Rendezvous (built 1913) measuring 74 feet (23 metres) and setting 5,500 square feet (510 square metres) of sail.

=== Rig characteristics ===
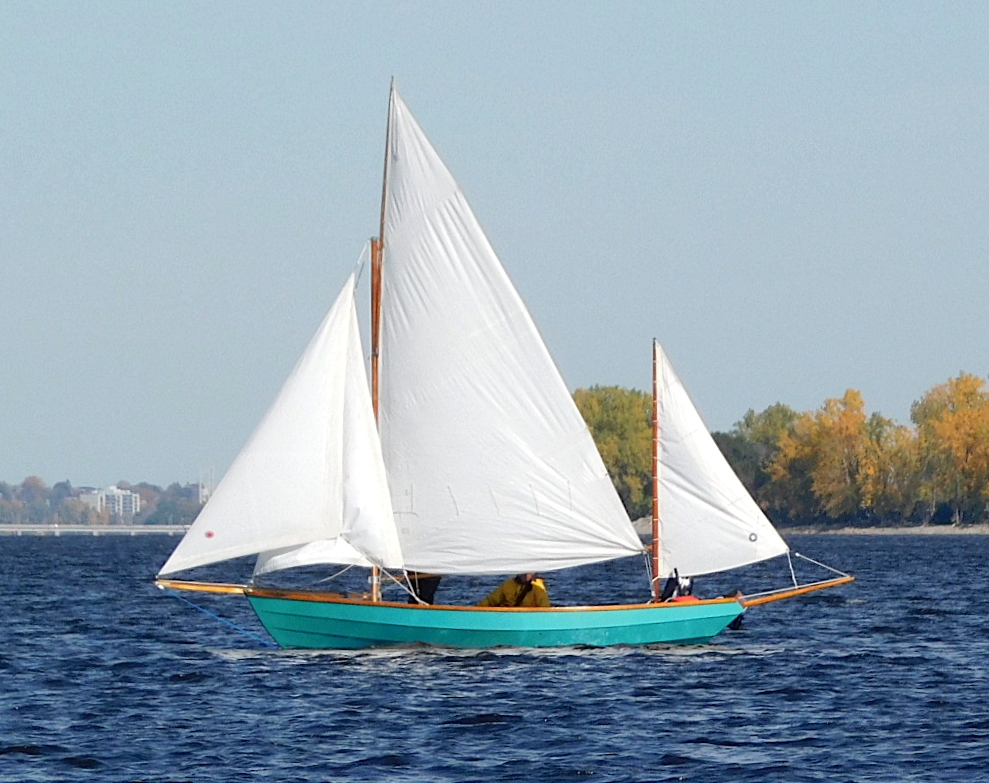
The Drascombe Lugger is rigged as a yawl with a gunter mainsail and a leg o'mutton mizzen, sheeted to an outrigger.

A yawl is often considered a suitable rig for a short-handed or single-handed sailor. This is because the mainsail is not quite so big to handle and the mizzen (before the days of modern self-steering gear) could allow the sails to be trimmed to keep a boat on the same course. Also, handing (taking down) the mizzen is a quick and easy way of reducing sail, often thought of as the equivalent of the first reef in a cutter or sloop. Less well known are the advantages of setting a mizzen staysail when reaching, which can give a considerable amount of extra drive not available to a single-masted rig. Alec Rose (single-handed circumnavigator) used a mizzen staysail on his yawl Lively Lady but did not set a mizzen, feeling it was of little value and would interfere with the Hasler self-steering gear.

=== Current examples ===
Yawls are currently popular in cruising dinghies. The Drascombe Lugger is a good example of this type. With the mizzen sheeted to an outrigger or boomkin and a jib set on a bowsprit, the rig extends a lot horizontally. This allows the sail area to have a lower centre of pressure than, for example, a Bermudan sloop. This gives a lower heeling moment.

== The hull type ==
Before "yawl" became the name of a rig, it was a hull type. Generally, a yawl is a double-ended, clinker built open boat, which can be worked under sail or oar. They are considered to have Viking or Norse influence in their design. Most were operated from a beach or a small harbour, with the boat being hauled out of the water when not in use.

=== Scotland: yawl/yole/yoal ===
In the North of Scotland, yawl is cognate with yole or yoal. There are examples in both Shetland and Orkney, with type and local variations in design. The Shetland boats include foureens and sixareens; the names denote the number of oars they were designed to use. Both also had sailing rigs, usually a single masted dipping lug. A sixareen was typically 24 to 25 feet (7.3 to 7.6 metres) long overall. The foureen was around 20 feet (6.1 metres) overall. Other smaller Shetland types were the Ness Yole and the Fair Isle Yole. Sixareens and foureens were used in the haaf fishery catching white fish species such as cod and saithe with long line fishing. These undecked sixareens operated between 30 and 50 miles offshore, sometimes within sight of Norway. The foureens ventured up to 20 miles offshore (where they "sank the land"; i.e. when the land had just sunk below the horizon, it was 20 miles away). Until the 19th century, most of these boats were built in Norway and then transported to Shetland disassembled, where they were put back together again. It appears that the Norwegian boatbuilders built specific types of craft to meet the needs of the Shetland market, as these boats differed somewhat from the ones used in Norway. Surviving examples and a replica of some of these Shetland boats are in the Shetland Museum.

The Orkney yoles had more beam than their Shetland counterparts. This allowed slightly more sail to be set, so these were two-masted with standing lug rigs.

=== Norfolk and Suffolk Beach Yawls ===
Beach Yawls could be found along a section of the East Anglian coast, mainly from Winterton on the north Norfolk coast down to Aldeburgh on the Suffolk coast. (They were called "yols" by the men who sailed in them.) Each boat was operated by a "company" that shared the profits of operations between their members, subject to strict rules. The members were entitled to serve as crew when the yawl was launched. These companies are known to have existed at the start of the 18th century and yawls operated right through the 19th century, until steam power, efficient tugs and lifeboats put the last of them out of business by the start of the 20th century.

The yawls serviced the ships anchored in Yarmouth Roads, took pilots to and from ships, carried stores and performed salvage work. The Royal Navy often had warships anchored in Yarmouth roads, so providing a lot of work additional to that from the many merchant ships that passed along the East Anglian coast.

The Norfolk and Suffolk Beach Yawls were probably the fastest open boats ever built. Fourteen knots could be achieved in the right conditions, and 16 knots has been measured for one of these boats. Clinker-built and double-ended, the hulls were typically 50 feet (15 metres) long with a beam of 8 to 10 ft (2.4 to 3.0 m). Reindeer, built in 1838 was at the top of the size range, at 75 ft (23 m) long (with a 12 ft (3.7 m) beam). Whilst the earlier boats had three lug-rigged masts, in common with other types of British lugger, from the middle of the 19th century the mainmast was usually dispensed with to give a dipping lug foresail and a standing lug mizzen. The foresail tack fastened to an iron bumkin protruding from the stemhead. The mizzen sheeted to an outrigger (called an "outligger" by the crews of these boats). The fastest type of Beach Yawl was used for taking pilots and passengers out to ships. The slightly shorter and beamier "bullock boats" carried supplies out to ships moored in the roads and would land catches of herrings from luggers.

Beach Yawls were kept ready for launching at a moment's notice. A lookout tower was manned to spot any ship signalling for a pilot or in distress. There was competition between each company to get any potential work. The boats were run down the shingle beach on greased wooden skids laid at right angles to their route. Men ran alongside to hold the boat upright as it started to move, crew members scrambled aboard and others passed bags of ballast on board. As the boat entered the water she was given a final shove with a spar. Then each boat raced to get the work on offer.

Large crews were needed: 25 men would be common. They were fully occupied if going to windward. On tacking, the foresail would be dipped behind the mast to set on the other side, and the halyard (which was made fast at the gunwale to help support the mast) and burton (a moveable stay) would be shifted to windward and hauled taught again, whilst others would be heaving bags of shingle ballast to the new windward side of the bilge. Some would be continuously baling to rid the boat of the spray that came aboard. The most important man aboard tended the foresheet, which was never cleated, but held in hand after taking a couple of turns around the main sampson post. If a gust was too strong, the sheet would instantly be eased to prevent a capsize. If worked under oar, a yawl would have ten or more oars a side - though the beach companies usually operated a gig in light weather if delivering or collecting a pilot, as they were faster under oars.

== Ship's boat ==
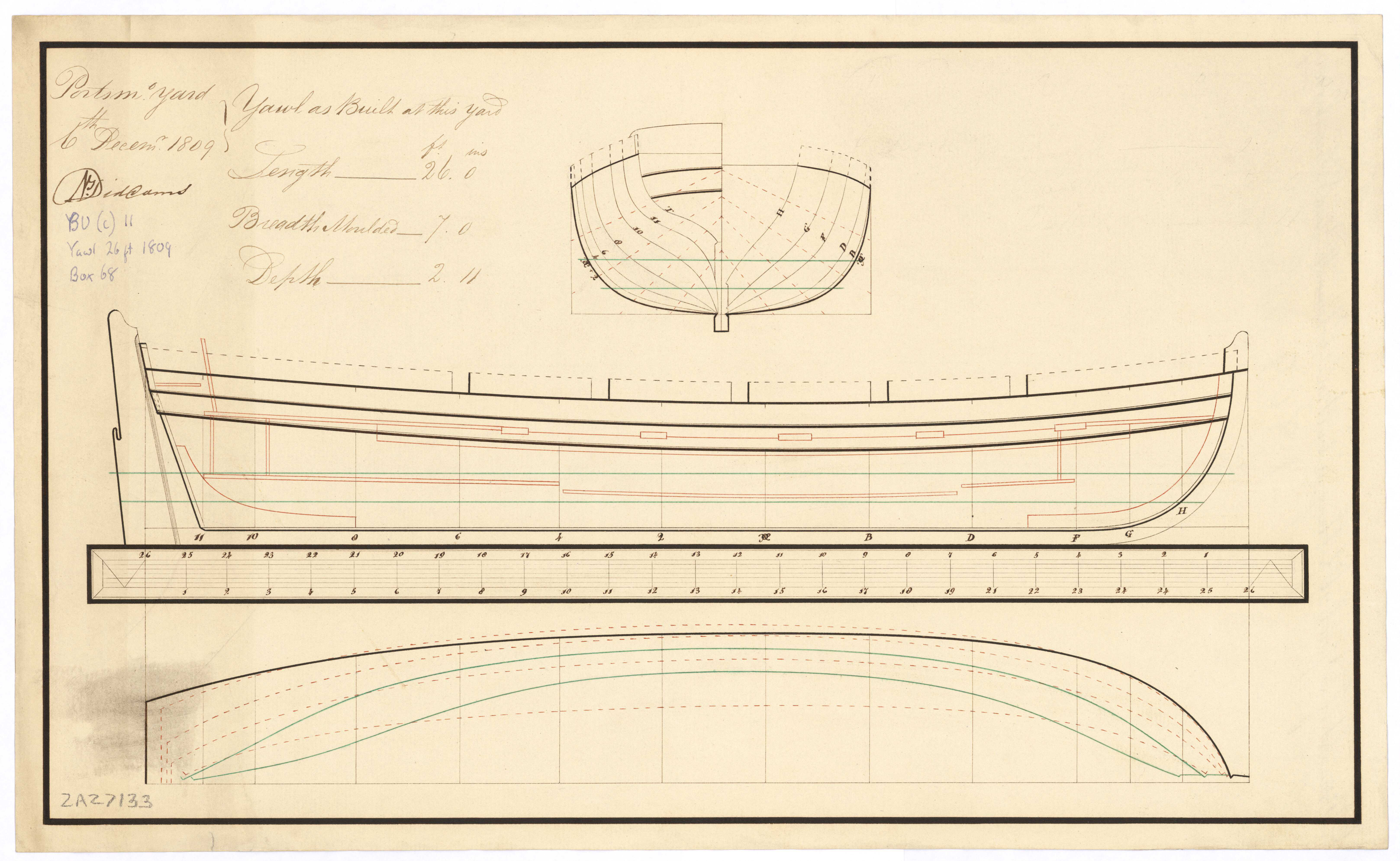
The plans for the hull of a 26-ft yawl built for the Royal Navy in 1809 in Portsmouth Dockyard. It is fitted for 10 oars.

The yawl as a type of Royal Navy ship's boat appeared early in the second half of the 17th century. In early mentions, they were sometimes referred to as "Norway yawls", so showing a Scandinavian influence. Later yawls were built in Deal, Kent. Both were clinker-built, but those from Deal had transom sterns. When Navy dockyards started to copy the Deal-built boats, they moved to carvel construction. The size of an individual yawl would vary depending on the size of the ship to which she belonged - though the yawl was usually the smallest of the several types of boat typically carried on each ship. In 1817, Royal Navy yawls were issued in eight different lengths between 26 ft and 16 ft. After this date, the yawl was less commonly used. The sailing rig was two-masted, typically setting identical sprit-sails. The number of oars depended on the size of the boat, eight and six being common, with some pulling just four oars.

== See also ==
- Concordia yawls
- Yoal

== Bibliography ==
- Barnes, Roger (2014). The Dinghy Cruising Companion: Tales and Advice from Sailing in a Small Open Boat (Kindle ed.). Oxford: Adlard Coles. ISBN 978-1-4081-7916-1.
- Chivers, Marc (10 February 2015). "The Shetland Boat: History; Folklore and Construction". Shetland Boat Research.
- Cooper, Ernest R (1927). "The Suffolk and Norfolk Beach Yawls". Mariner's Mirror. 13 (3): 213–218. doi:10.1080/00253359.1927.10655424.
- Cunliffe, Tom (2016). Hand, Reef and Steer: Traditional Sailing Skills for Classic Boats (second ed.). London: Adlard Coles. ISBN 978-1-4729-2522-0.
- Leather, John (1970). Gaff Rig. London: Adlard Coles Limited. ISBN 0-229-97489-9.
- Leather, John (1989) [1979]. Spritsails and Lugsails. Camden, Maine: International Marine Publishing Company. ISBN 0-87742-998-7.
- Mannering, Julian; Greenhill, Basil, eds. (2013) [1997]. Inshore Craft, Traditional Working Vessels of the British Isles. Barnsley: Seaforth Publishing. ISBN 978-1-84832-167-0.
- March, Edgar J. (2005a) [1970]. Inshore Craft of Great Britain in the Days of Sail and Oar. Vol. 1. London: Chatham Publishing. ISBN 1-86176-264-X.
- March, Edgar J. (2005b) [1970]. Inshore Craft of Great Britain in the Days of Sail and Oar. Vol. 2. London: Chatham Publishing. ISBN 1-86176-269-0.
- May, W E; Stephens, Simon (2003) [1999]. The Boats of Men of War. London: Caxton Editions. ISBN 1-84067-4318.
- McKee, Eric (1997) [1983]. Working Boats of Britain, Their Shape and Purpose. London: Conway Maritime Press. ISBN 0-85177-277-3.
- Rye, Theo (24 January 2017). "Great Yacht Designs 7 - Lively Lady". Classic Boat.
- "Keeping Tradition Afloat". Shetland Museum & Archives.
- White, E W (1950). British Fishing Boats and Coastal Craft. HM Stationery Office. ISBN 978-1-4474-1119-2.
