= Oselvar =

Wooden rowing boat traditionally used in Norway

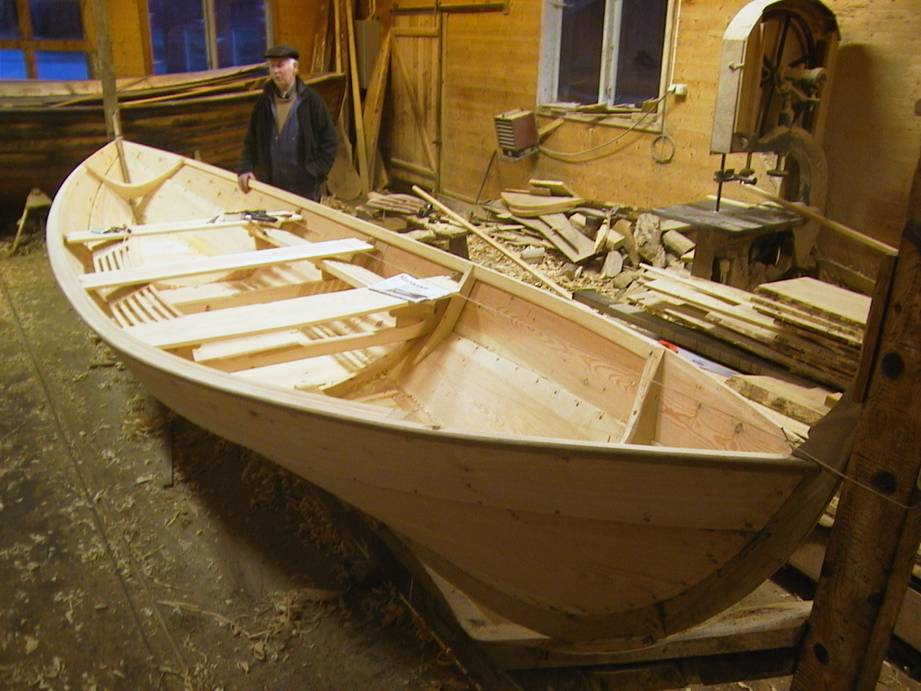
An oselvar under construction.

Oselvar on the coat of arms of Os, Hordaland

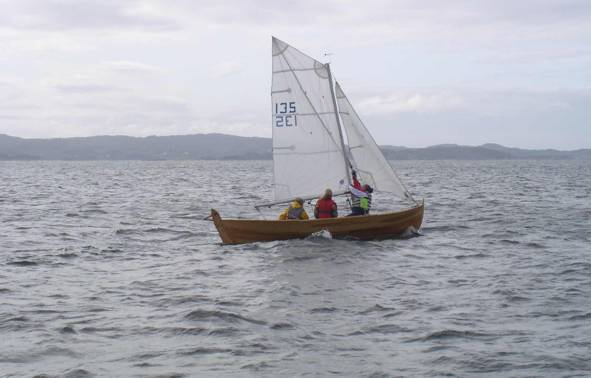
Oselvar with sail

The Oselvar (Nynorsk) or Oselver (Bokmål) is a small wooden rowing boat traditionally built and used along the west coast of Norway. The Oselvar is a clinker built boat with thin, very wide planks. Almost all parts of an Oselvar are made of pine, with only the keel of oak.

== History ==
This type of boat has been very common in the outer regions of Hordaland for hundreds of years. It was named after the major important building site for this type of boat during the 18th century, at the mouth of the Oselva River in Os Municipality in Hordaland county. In the early 1800s, boat building was an important industry in Os Municipality and the neighboring Tysnes Municipality, on the other side of the fjord. The stylized figure of an Oselvar appears on the coat of arms of the old Os Municipality.

Dating from at least the 1500s and continuing until 1860, these boats were exported in kit form principally to the Shetland and Orkney islands. During the North Sea crossing, the wooden boats were taken apart and then 'flat packed' for shipping. Instead of sending complicated assembly instructions, they sent Norwegian boatbuilders to re-build them.

Although initially a working row or sail boat, the Oselvar also has a long tradition as a leisure craft. A boat which could achieve both grace and speed was perfect for sailing and rowing competitions. The first regatta was arranged by the Bergen Sailing Association on Midsummer's Day in 1871. Today several clubs and sailing associations are engaged in promoting the traditions of the Oselvar, both as a sports and leisure boat. In 2009, the boat was voted Norwegian national boat in a poll held by the Norwegian Society for Sea Rescue.

== See also ==
- Yoal
- Faering

== Related reading ==
- Leather, John (1990) Clinker Boatbuilding (Adlard Coles) ISBN 978-0-7136-3643-7
