= Gableboat =

Traditional Norwegian fishing vessel

A gableboat (gavelbåt or gavlabåt in Norwegian) is a traditional Norwegian boat mainly used for fishing with a seine. It is usually built by clinker method pine on oak framework. They are robust boats that can carry big loads, but are still swift sailers.

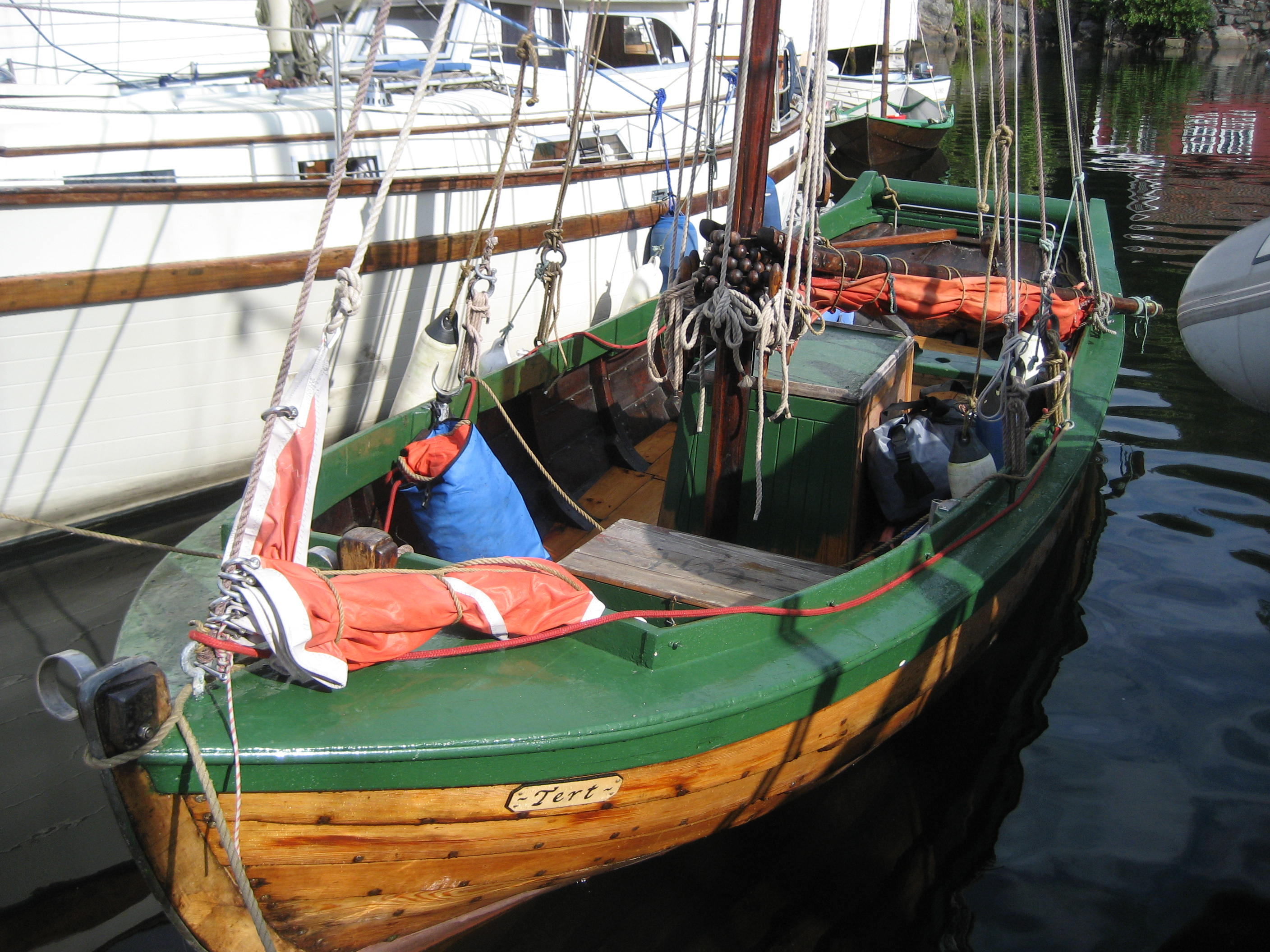

The gableboat got its name by the gable in the aft, making the rear bottom flatter than round-ended vessels, enabling them to both have a bigger load, and to create less friction when sailing or rowing.
