= Gloup Holm =

Island in United Kingdom

Coordinates: 60°45′N 1°07′W

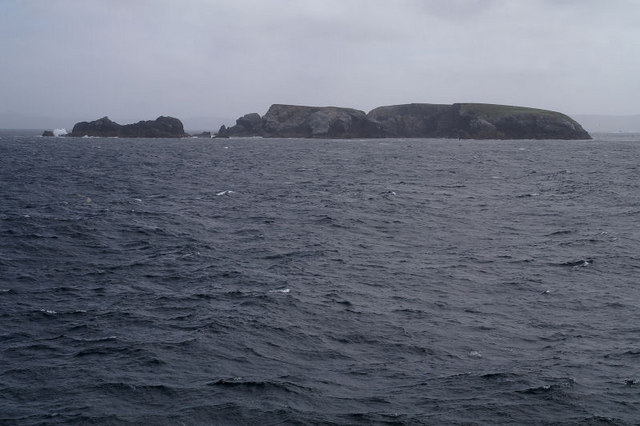
Gloup Holm with the Clapper on the left

Gloup Holm is an islet in the Shetland Islands, lying to the north of Yell.

== Geography and geology ==
Gloup Holm is near to the part of Yell called North Neaps, near Gloup. It has an area of 30.4 acres or 12.3 hectares.

Rocks to the north include the Clapper and to the south-east is Eagle Stack. To the south west is Bagi Stack and to the west Whilkie Stack.

The island is owned by Robert Henderson, of neighbouring Cullivoe.

== History ==
Gloup Holm derives its name from the village of Gloup and Gloup Voe on the "mainland" of Yell. These names derive from the Old Norse for a ravine. Gloup Holm belonged to the ancient parish and current quoad sacra parish of North Yell.

== See also ==
- List of islands of Scotland
