= Gloup =

Coordinates: 60.722°N 1.071°W

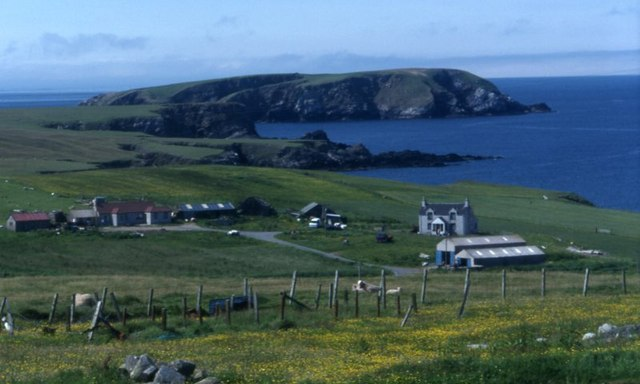
- Houses at the end of the road into Gloup, with Gloup Holm beyond

- Location within Shetland
- OS grid reference: HP506046
- Civil parish: Yell
- Council area: Shetland
- Lieutenancy area: Shetland
- Country: Scotland
- Sovereign state: United Kingdom
- Post town: SHETLAND
- Postcode district: ZE2
- Dialling code: 01957
- Police: Scotland
- Fire: Scottish
- Ambulance: Scottish
- UK Parliament: Orkney and Shetland
- Scottish Parliament: Shetland

Note: Gloup is common in Scottish placenames referring to a sea jet.

Gloup (Shaetlan pronunciation: [glup] GLOOP) is a village in the far north of the island of Yell in the Shetland Islands. It lends its name to nearby island of Gloup Holm.

Gloup Holm derives its name from the village of Gloup and Gloup Voe on the "mainland" of Yell. These names derive from the Old Norse for a ravine.

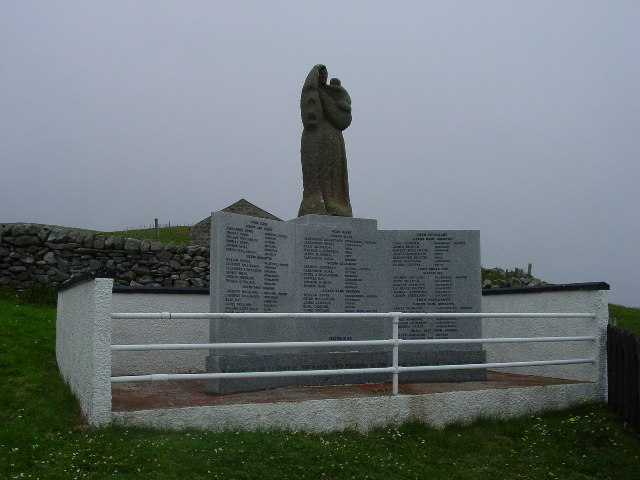
Memorial to the Gloup Disaster

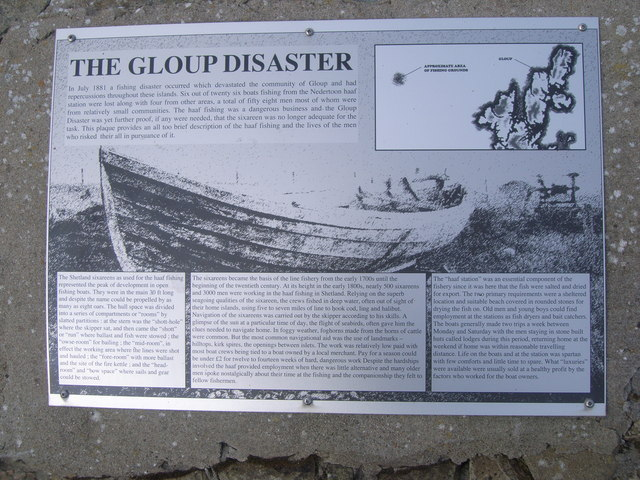
The Gloup Disaster Information Board

In 20/21 July 1881, the Gloup Fishing Disaster occurred, in which 58 fishermen were killed by an unexpected summer storm coming from the direction of Iceland. In 1981, a hundred years after the event a memorial was erected to commemorate the victims. Ten boats were lost, mostly sixareens.
