= Faering =

Type of boat

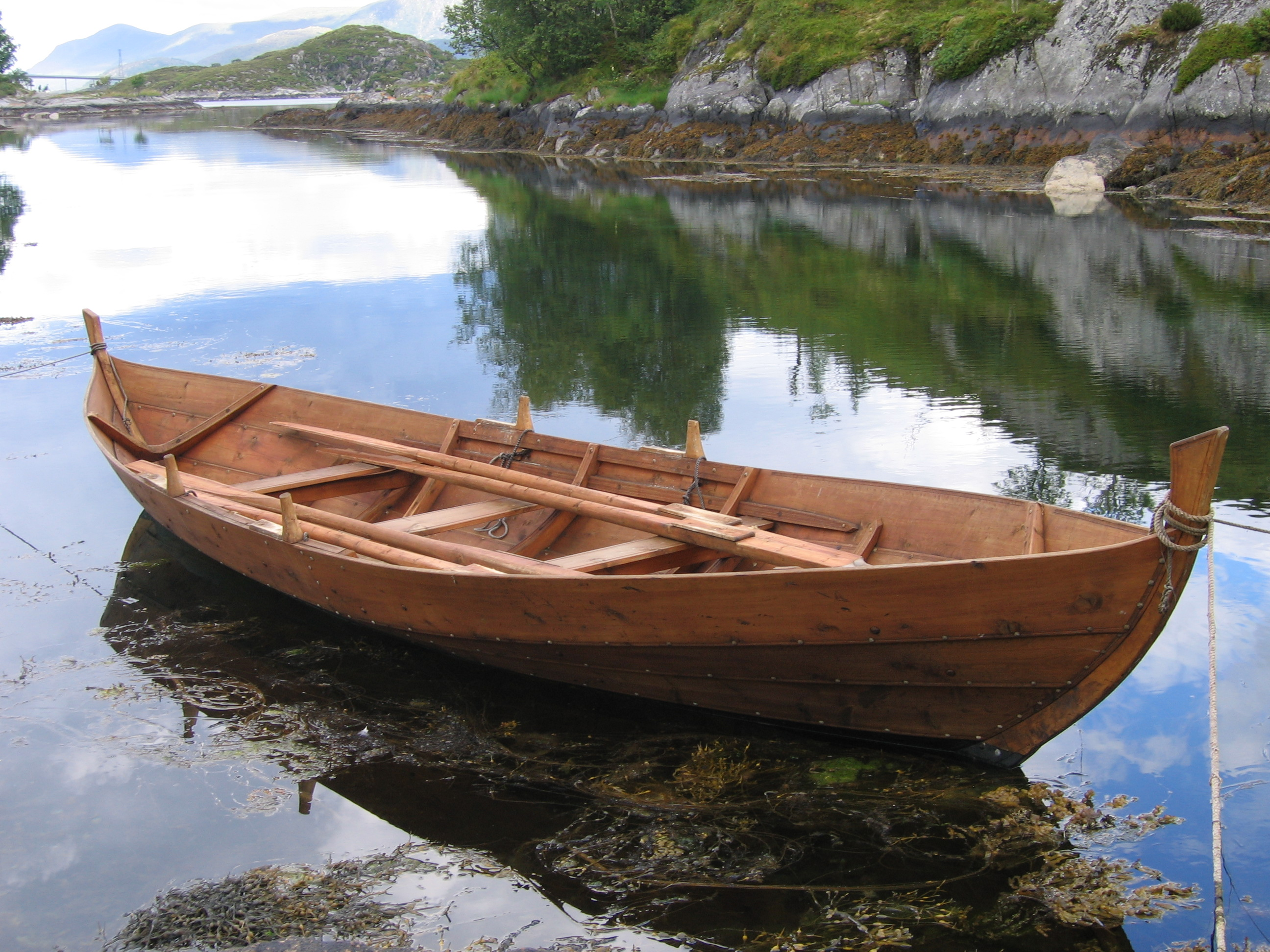
Sunnmørsfæring exhibited at Herøy coastal museum, Møre og Romsdal, Norway. (Photo: Silje L. Bakke)

A faering is an open boat with two pairs of oars, commonly found in most boat-building traditions in western and northern Scandinavia.

== History ==
Faerings are clinker-built, with planks overlapped and riveted together to form the hull. This type of boat has a history dating back to Viking-era Scandinavia. The small boats found with the 9th century Gokstad ship resemble those still used in Western and Northern Norway, and testify to a long tradition of boat building. Faerings may carry a small sail, traditionally a square sail, in addition to oars. The only significant difference being a conversion from a side-mounted rudder to stern-mounted. They are used as small fishing vessels in areas of modern Norway, and occasionally raced.

== Etymology ==
The word faering comes from the Norwegian word færing (Old Norse feræringr), literally meaning "four-oaring".

== See also ==
- Knarr
- Spritsail
- Oselvar
- Nordland

== Other sources ==
- Greenhill, Basil (1976) Archaeology of the Boat (London: Adam and Charles Black Publishers Ltd) ISBN 978-0-7136-1645-3
- Leather, John (1990) Clinker Boatbuilding (Adlard Coles) ISBN 978-0-7136-3643-7
