= Sixareen =

Traditional fishing boat

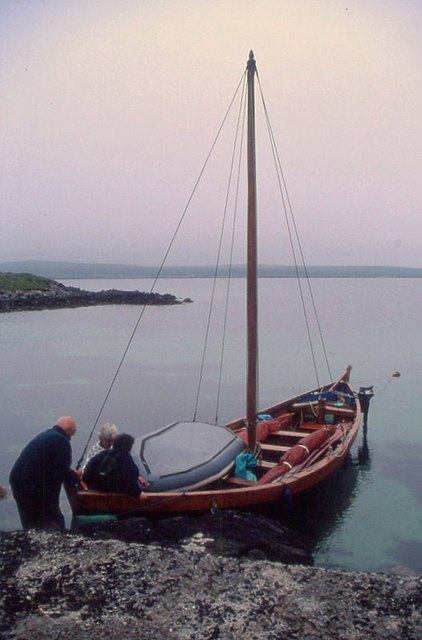
The sixareen, Far Haaf at Balta

The sixareen or sixern (Old Norse: sexæringr; Norwegian: seksring meaning "six-oared") is a traditional fishing boat used around the Shetland Islands. It is a clinker-built boat, evolved as a larger version of the yoal, when the need arose for crews to fish further from shore. The first of the sixareens were, like the yoal, imported from Norway in kit form until the mid 19th century, when increasing import duty made it more cost effective to import the raw materials and build the boats in Shetland.

== Construction and terminology ==
The sixareen was so named because she was crewed by six men, each man rowing a single oar, unlike the yoal where three men rowed a pair of oars each. The size of a sixareen was about 25–30 ft (7.6–9.1 m) overall, with a beam of 7–8 ft (2.1–2.4 m). The boat carried a square sail which was used when the wind was favourable, however in light winds or in a head wind the crew could row for many hours to complete their journey. Fishing trips usually were over three days, with the boats making two trips each week when the weather permitted.

As with the yoal, all the parts of a sixareen have names, which are usually found only in the Shetland dialect, although many of the names are derived from the old Norse language. The names of the parts listed here include the English name and where possible, the Norwegian name.

There are six separate rooms, or sections in a sixareen: The fore head where sails and tackle were stored, the fore room, the mid room where stones for ballast were placed, the owsin room which was kept clear for owsin (bailing) out water using an owsekerri, the shot room where the catch was stowed, and the kannie where the skipper sat at the helm.

The compartments in the boat were separated by tafts on which the crew sat, fiskabrods under the tafts which stopped the catch and fishing gear from shifting between rooms, and by baands, the frames to which the boards were fixed.

The boards, named from the keel upwards, were the boddam runner, the hassen, the first and second swills, the laands (four boards), and the reebin, the upper board, inside which the wale or gunwale was fixed. At the bow and stern the boards were fixed to the stammerin before attaching to the fore and aft stems. The reebin was additionally strengthened by the breast hook or hinny spot where it met the horn at the top of the stem.

== History ==
While the yoal was used for inshore fishing, and seldom ventured more than 10 mi (16 km) from land, the sixareen was used to fish up to 40 mi (64 km) from Shetland. Because of this, and the unpredictable nature of the weather in northern waters, the loss of boats and lives was high. The worst losses were on 16 July 1832 when 17 boats and 105 men were lost in a severe gale, and again on 21 July 1881 when a sudden and violent summer storm claimed 10 boats and 58 men, mostly from Gloup, in the north of Yell, in what became known as The Gloup Disaster.

Although it is not clear when the last sixareens were built for fishing, it is likely to be not much later than the late 1880s, by which time it was seen that larger boats were the way forward for the local fishing industry.

Two sixareens were built in the 20th century. In the 1980s Duncan Sandison of Unst realised that the sixareen was very much a boat of the past, as there were none left in Unst. With the help of a group of volunteers, after 800 hours work, the Far Haaf, a replica sixareen was completed in 1988, but was destroyed by a hurricane which swept the isles in 1992. Another Far Haaf was built and launched in 1993. It now occupies a special enclosure outside the Unst boat haven. Another sixareen, the Vaila Mae, was built in 2008 for the Shetland Museum in Lerwick, where it can be seen on the water during the summer months.
