= Clinker (boat building) =

Method of constructing boats and ships

A comparison of clinker and carvel plank designs in boat building.

Clinker-built, also known as lapstrake-built, is a method of boat building in which the edges of longitudinal (lengthwise-running) hull planks overlap each other.

The technique originated in Northern Europe, with the first known examples using metal fastenings that join overlapped planks in c. 310–320 AD. It was employed by the Anglo-Saxons, Frisians, and Scandinavians in the early middle ages, and later in the Basque shipbuilding region where the Newport medieval ship was built. It was also used in cogs, the other major ship construction type found in Northern Europe in the latter part of the medieval period.

UNESCO named the Nordic clinker boat tradition to its List of Intangible Cultural Heritage on December 14, 2021, in the first approval of a joint Nordic application.

== Description ==
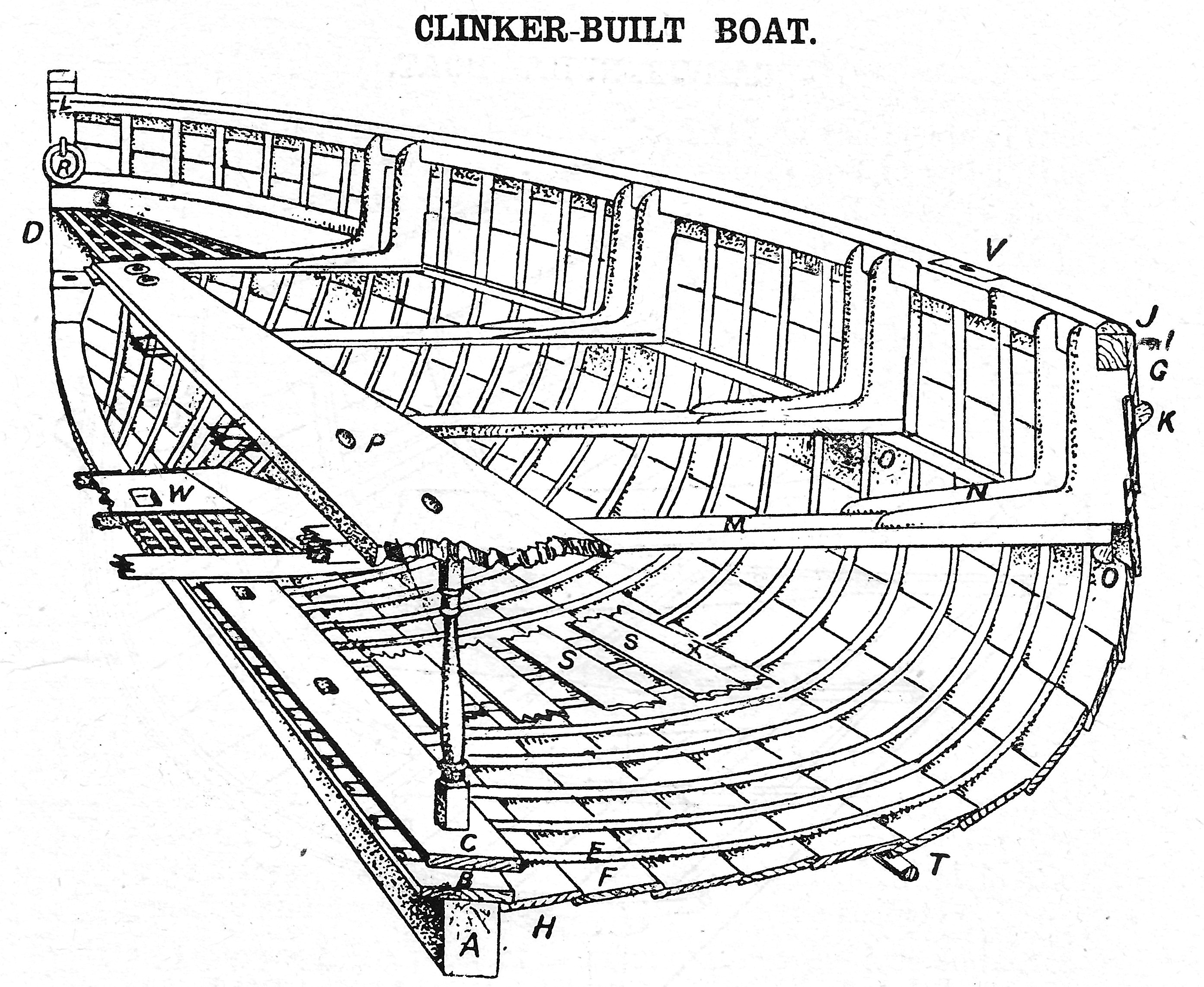
Diagram of clinker construction in the first half of the 20th century (Note: The key to (selected) labels on this diagram are as follows: A: keel B: hog C: keelson D: stem with apron E: timbers or floors F: planks G: top strake H: garboard strake I: gunwale J: capping K: rubbing strake L: breast hook M: thwart N: knees O: risings P: mast thwart S: bottom boards T: bilge rail V: socket for oar crutch (commonly called a rowlock) X: stretcher rail (the stretchers fit into notches in this rail))

Clinker construction is a boat and ship-building method in which the hull planks overlap and are joined by nails that are driven through the overlap (often called the "lap"). These fastenings typically go through a metal rove over which the protruding end of the nail is deformed in a process comparable to riveting the planks together. This gives a distinctive appearance to the outside of the hull as the overlaps are obvious in the stepped nature of the hull surface.

Clinker construction is a shell-first technique (in contrast to the frame-based nature of carvel). The construction sequence begins with the joining of the keel, stem and sternpost (or transom) and setting these in place in the build area. Thereafter, the shape of the hull is determined by the shaping and fitting of the hull planking that forms the waterproof exterior of the hull. Any reinforcing frames, thwarts or beams (Note: In some early instances, beams were notched over the planks, so they had to be installed before the next strake was added. This design was replaced by fastening beam ends to other framing components that spread the load better over the hull surface.) are added after the joining of the hull planks. This may involve completely finishing the exterior planking first, or just some planking may be fitted with, for instance, floors being added whilst that part of the hull is accessible before planking is continued.

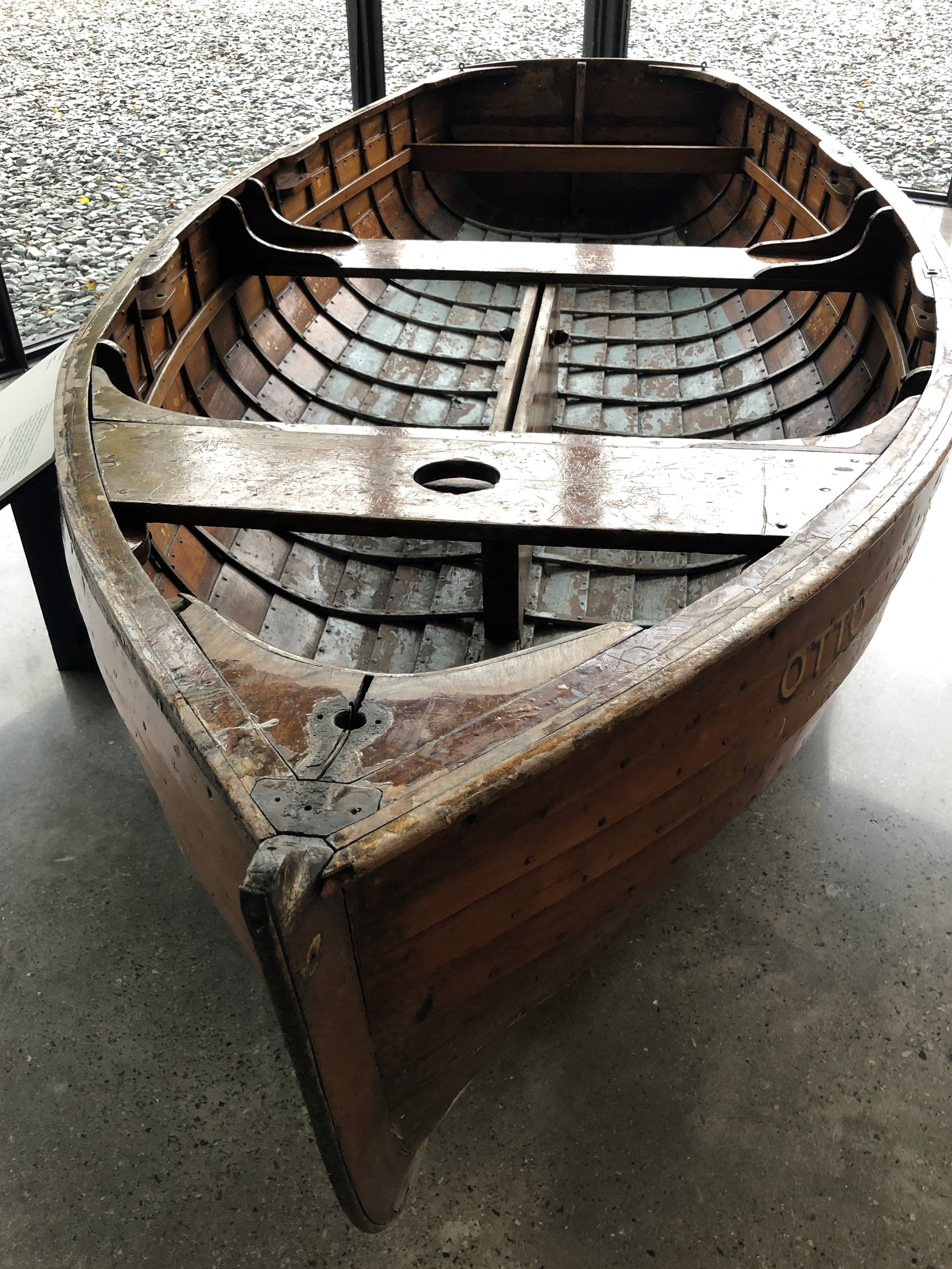
Clinker built dinghy showing some of the basic structural details. The single rowing thwart supports the after end of the centre-board case. The pairs of knees at each end of the thwart can be seen; also the longitudinal stringer (rising) on which the thwart rests.

Medieval clinker construction used iron nails and roves – the latter often being a distinctive diamond shape. There are less common regional instances of planks being joined with treenails or by sewing, but iron fastening predominated. More modern boats generally use copper nails with an annular rove of the same material.

Historically, particularly in the traditional Nordic style (Note: Nordic clinker construction has been categorised into "traditional" and "modern". These two styles originate from increasing change in the details of clinker construction, starting from the 13th century onwards, but with the traditional remaining in use in the Northern part of Scandinavia, where there was limited urbanisation and little trade to continental Europe. Conversely, the modern tradition adopted ship-building practices that were influenced by contact from outside Scandinavia. Use of sawn planking is an example.), clinker construction most commonly used cleft, or radially split, oak planks. This gives a stronger piece of timber than with sawn material – not only is the grain continuous along the length of the piece, but the medullary rays are aligned in the same plane as the timber surface, so maximising the strength available. However, this timber conversion method does limit the maximum width of plank to slightly more than one third of the diameter of the tree from which it is split – the narrowest part (including any pith) and the sapwood are cut off. The slightly uneven surface found on cleft timber is the reason why caulking is laid in the overlap between the hull planks during construction, often using animal hair.

== History ==
The term clinker derives from a common Germanic word for clinch or clench, a word meaning “to fasten together”.

=== Historical context: other systems ===
In the first few centuries AD, several boat and ship-building systems existed in Europe. In the Mediterranean, flush-planked hulls were produced by edge-to-edge joining of the hull planking with mortise and tenon joints. This was a shell-first technique (Note: Other descriptive terms for the same concept include "plank orientated", "planking first", etc,), which started with a keel, stem and stern-post, to which planking was added. The hull was then reinforced by the addition of frames. The shape of the individual planks generates the shape of the hull. In the Roman-occupied parts of Northern Europe, the Romano-Celtic tradition involved flush-planking that was not joined with mortise and tenon joints but was connected by framing elements. (This may be a building tradition that continued with the bottom planking of the medieval cog and then into the Dutch bottom-based building methods of the 17th century.) The Romano-Celtic method of construction is also a shell-first technique, in that the hull shape is dictated by the shaping of the planks, not by the underlying framing of the finished hull.

=== Origins of clinker ===
There are precursors of clinker construction. The archaeological remains of a river boat dated to the first two centuries AD (described as Romano-Celtic), found in Pommerœul in Belgium, had a single strake that overlapped the underlying plank – though it is not clear how it was fastened. Earlier finds have bevelled lap joints or other similar arrangements that do not have the full lap of clinker. These include the Dover boat and Ferriby 1 (both dating to the middle of the second millennium BC) and the Hjortspring boat (c. 300-350 BC). In these cases, the planks are stitched or sewn together. The Hjortspring boat is built shell-first so suggesting some continuity with the Nordic tradition of clinker construction.

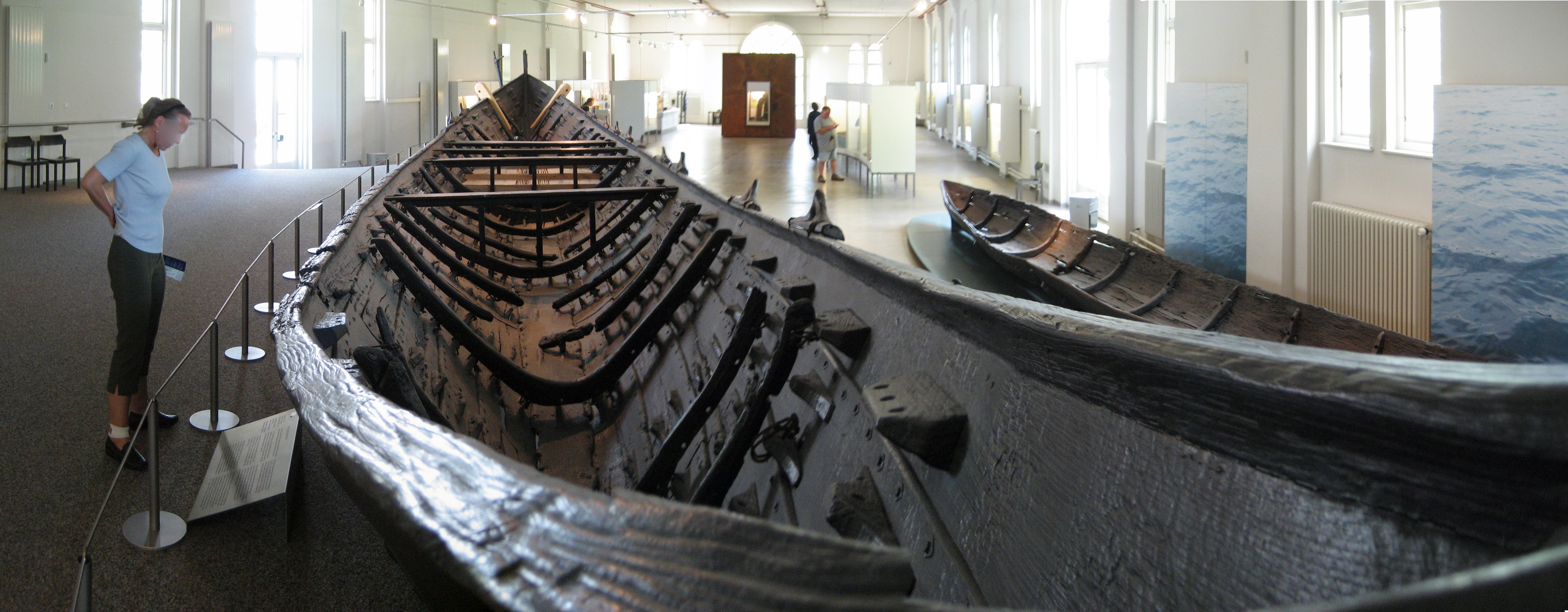
The Nydam boat, an early example of clinker construction.

The earliest examples of ship and boat building using overlapped planking joined with metal fastenings are two contemporarey finds from Scandinavia. One is an extended logboat from Sweden, the Björke boat (c. 320 AD), and the other is a longship from Denmark, the Nydam boat (c. 320 AD). The latter is an almost complete example of a boat built with clinker construction. It has overlapping planks joined with iron nails driven through the lap, however, with some elements being sewn, showing a late intermediate stage between earlier sewn shipbuilding and later nailed shipbuilding. The nails are clenched over roves on the inside of the planking. The boat was built shell-first.

=== Into the medieval ===
Though clinker construction is closely associated with Nordic countries, the same technique was used at an early stage in other parts of Northern Europe. The Saxon burial ship at Sutton Hoo in eastern England is an early (c. 630 AD) example of this sort of ship occurring in the broader Northern European area. Other sites from the 7th century AD include Kvalsund, Norway, Gretstedbro in Jutland and Snape in eastern England. One difference from the Nydam boat is that individual planks in the later period are shorter and narrower. This suggests that large oak trees for ship-building had become significantly less common by the 7th century, so timber of smaller dimensions had to be used.

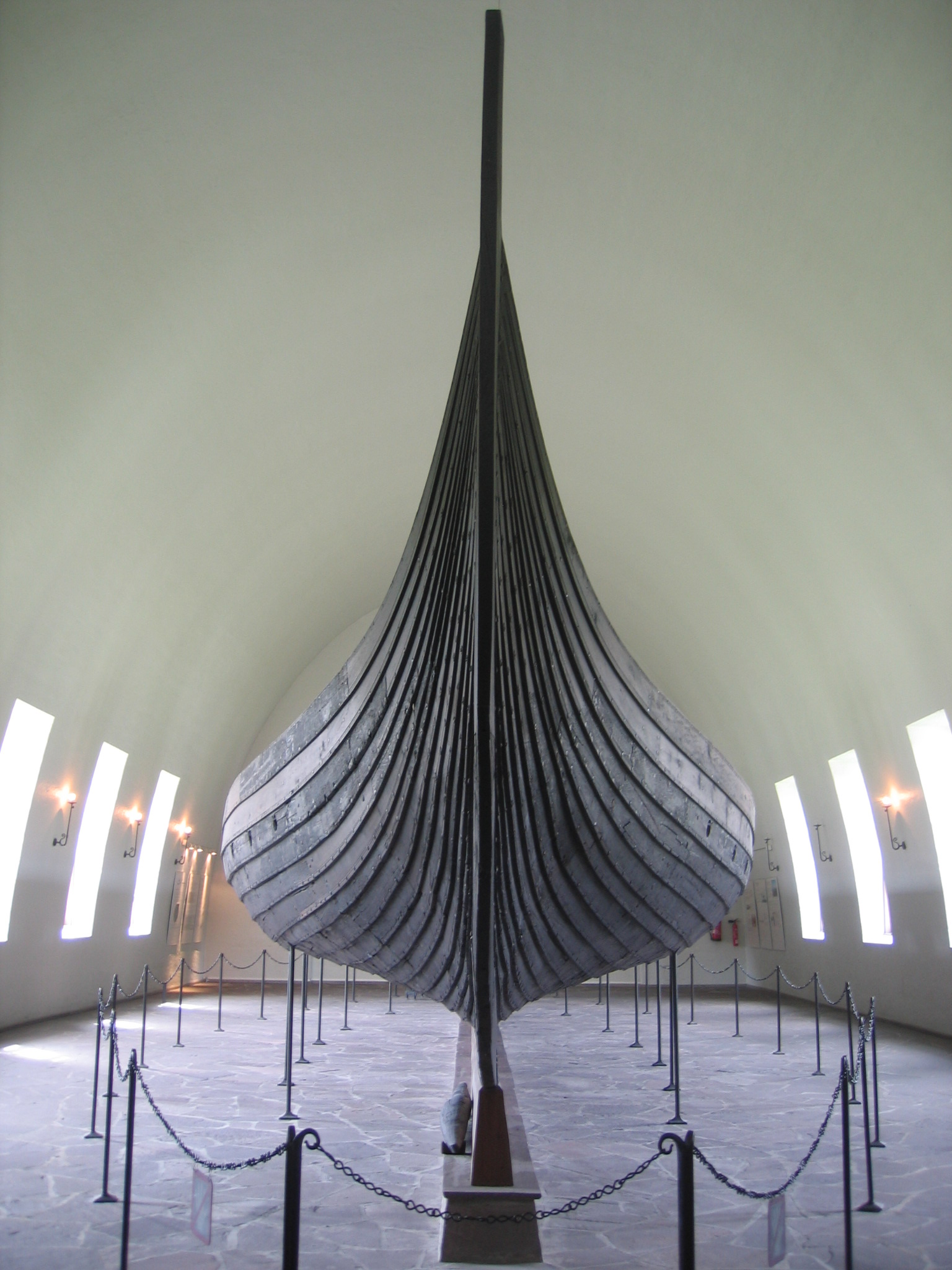
The Gokstad Ship, a Viking longship, displaying the overlapping planks that characterize clinker construction.

The 8th, 9th and 10th centuries saw the use of Viking longships for raiding and settlement. Archaeological remains of these clinker-built ships include the Oseberg ship and the Gokstad ship. These show some development from earlier vessels, including a partial keelson which acted as the mast step. As well as these warship types, cargo vessels were built which were less extreme with greater beam and more emphasis on propulsion by sail, together with extra cross-beams to strengthen the hull for greater weight carrying.

The cog is part of another ship-building tradition in Northern Europe that existed at the same time that the purely Nordic-tradition clinker vessels were being built. Though the classic cog construction uses flush planking for the bottom, the sides are constructed in a clinker method – with the difference that the nails that passed through overlapping planks were simply bent over and driven back into the plank, rather than using roves.

Clinker-built vessels were constructed as far South as the Basque country; the Newport Medieval Ship is an example. By the 14th century, clinker-built ships and the cog represented the major construction methods in Northern Europe.

=== Introduction of carvel to Northern Europe ===
Carvel construction was developed in the Mediterranean around the end of the Classical antiquity period. (Note: The shipbuilding changes in the Mediterranean region once appeared to be a simple and steady transition away from the mortise and tenon edge-joined hull planking to carvel. As more archaeological finds have been investigated, the evidence suggests that this was not a linear developmental process.) By the end of the 13th century AD, Mediterranean ships were being built on a skeleton basis, with hull planks being fixed to the frames and not to each other. At the same time, Northern European cogs were voyaging into the Mediterranean. The two maritime technological traditions had differences beyond the hull construction methods. Mediterranean ships were carvel-built, lateen rigged (using more than one mast on larger vessels) and still used side rudders. The visiting cogs had a single square-rigged mast, a stern-post mounted pintle-and-gudgeon rudder and clinker sides.

As part of the process of merging these two sets of traditions, carvel-built ships started to arrive in Northern waters. They were soon followed by shipwrights with the skills to build in carvel construction, with the first being built in this region in the late 1430s. The change is still not well understood. The frames of carvel could be made stronger to support the weight of the guns that ships were starting to carry and allowed gun-ports to be cut in the hull. Carvel construction may have solved the shortage of large cleft oak planks from which to make larger clinker vessels. Despite the large-scale move over to carvel construction for large vessels, clinker construction remained prominent throughout Northern Europe.

=== Modern period ===
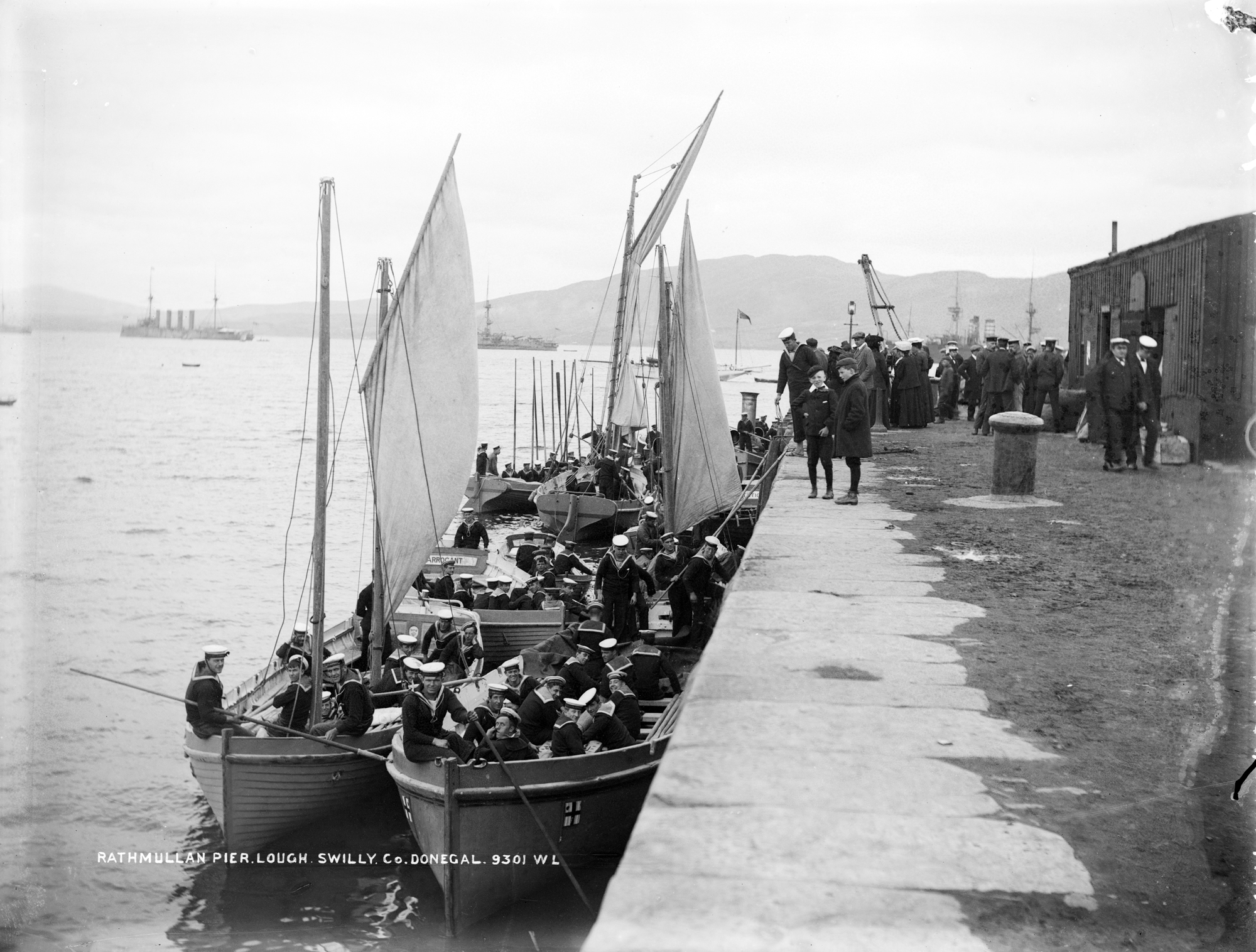
Ship's boats from several RN ships, 1909. The mix of carvel and clinker construction can be seen.

Generally, after the establishment of carvel construction for ships, clinker construction continued for boats across Northern Europe. A wide range of traditional craft were built in clinker. Yawls were ubiquitous around the coasts of Britain and Ireland. They included the fast-sailing Suffolk Beach Yawls; one was recorded making 16 knots. Examples of more general working craft were the ship's boats that were carried by larger vessels. Some Royal Navy boats that were built in Navy dockyards were carvel-built, but many, including those bought in from builders in Deal were clinker. The civilian boats built and used in Deal, their crews famous for their servicing of ships anchored in the Downs, were examples of the many beach-launched clinker boats to be found in British waters. At the other end of Britain, Shetland had the yoal and the sixareen. The coasts of Northumberland and Yorkshire had the coble, with its distinctive hull shape.

A St. Ayles Skiff, an example of glued clinker construction

Nordic countries have many traditional boat types that were and are built in clinker. The Nordic clinker boat tradition was inscribed to the UNESCO List of the Intangible Cultural Heritage on December 14, 2021, as the first joint Nordic application to the list.

== Glued clinker construction ==
A modern variant of clinker construction is to glue the strakes together rather than using metal fastenings. This is a technique that was pioneered by Iain Oughtred. The planking is normally cut from plywood and, after shaping, is glued with epoxy resin. Based in Britain, Oughtred initially worked on designs based on traditional craft from the United States, but in the mid-1980s he produced designs inspired by Scottish working boats – types that were clinker-built. An example of his output is the St. Ayles Skiff and the technique is now used by other boat designers.

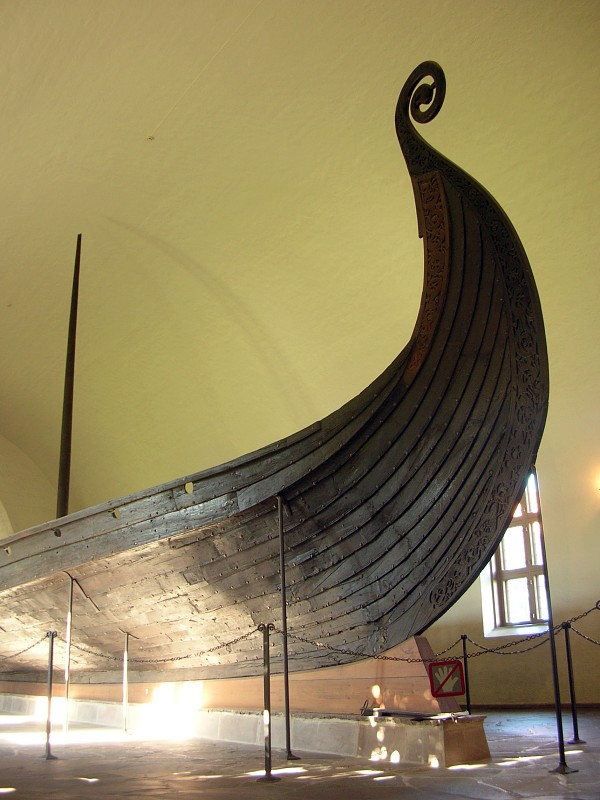
The bow of the Viking Oseberg ship

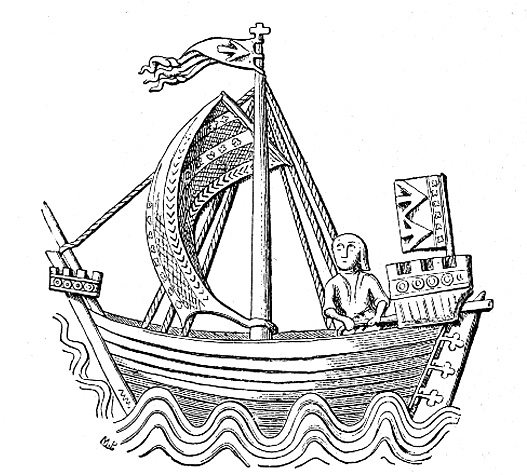
Clinker-built medieval cog from Stralsund.

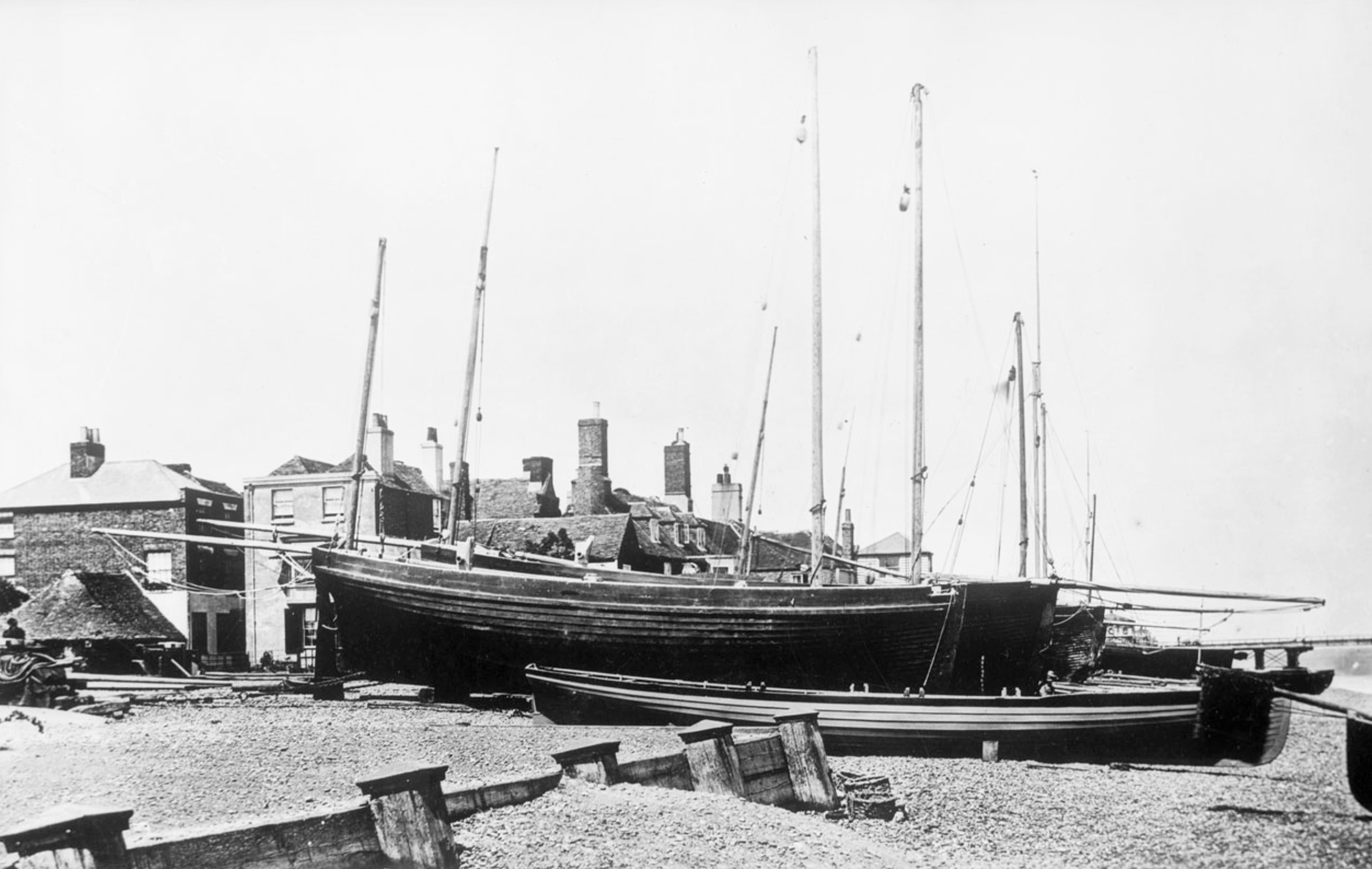
An 1866 photo of Deal luggers and, in the foreground, a four-oared galley, both types clinker-built

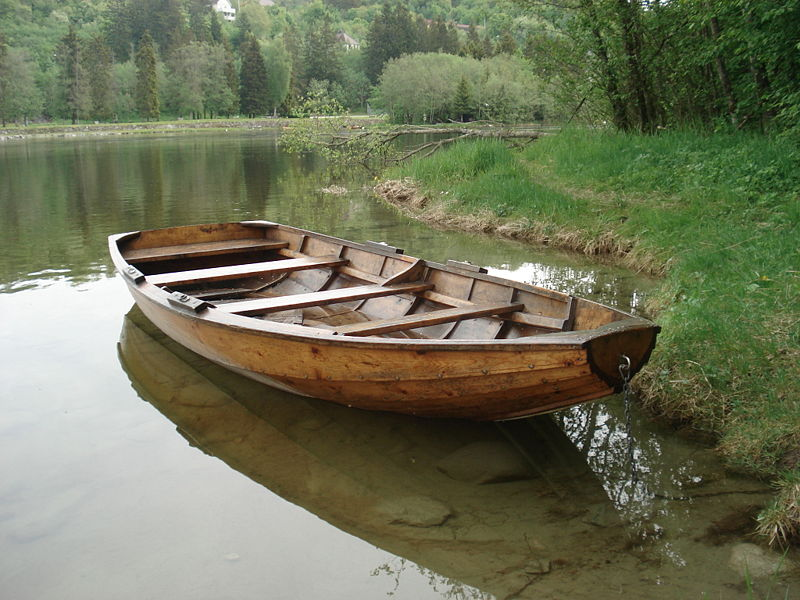
A Norwegian pram dinghy

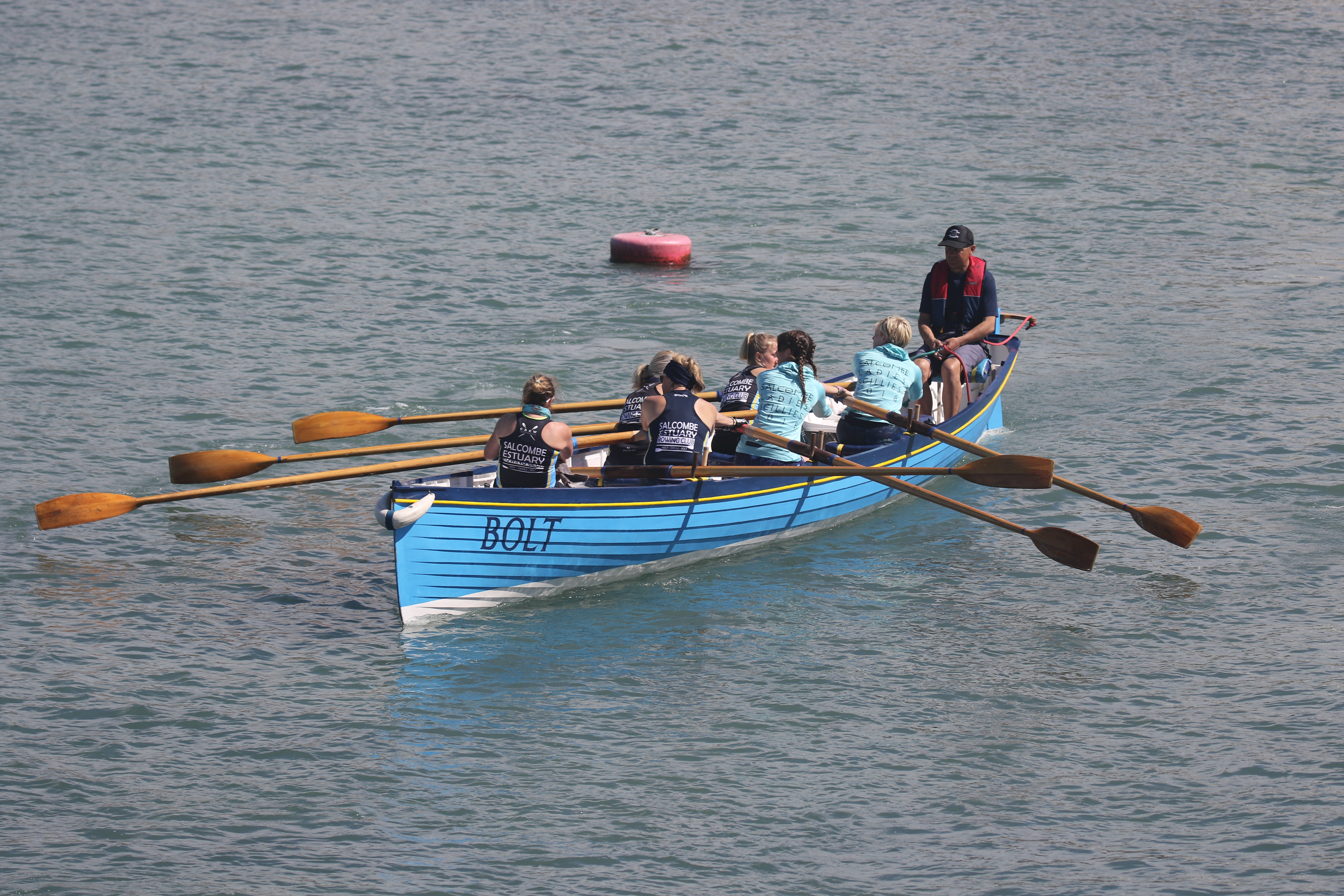
Cornish pilot gig, a type of working boat from the 19th and early 20th centuries, now popular for racing

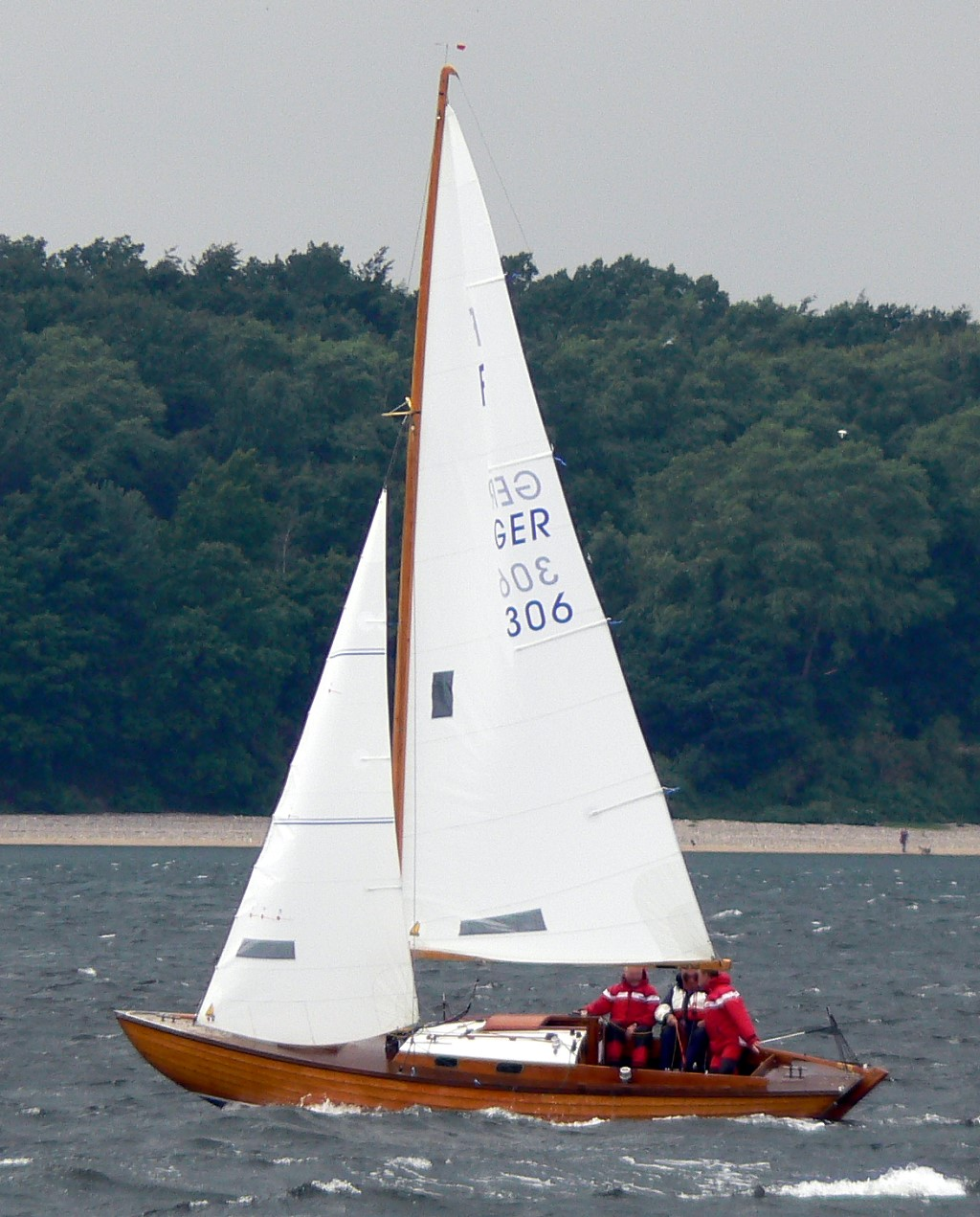
A Folkboat, a class of clinker-built long-keeled cruiser/racer

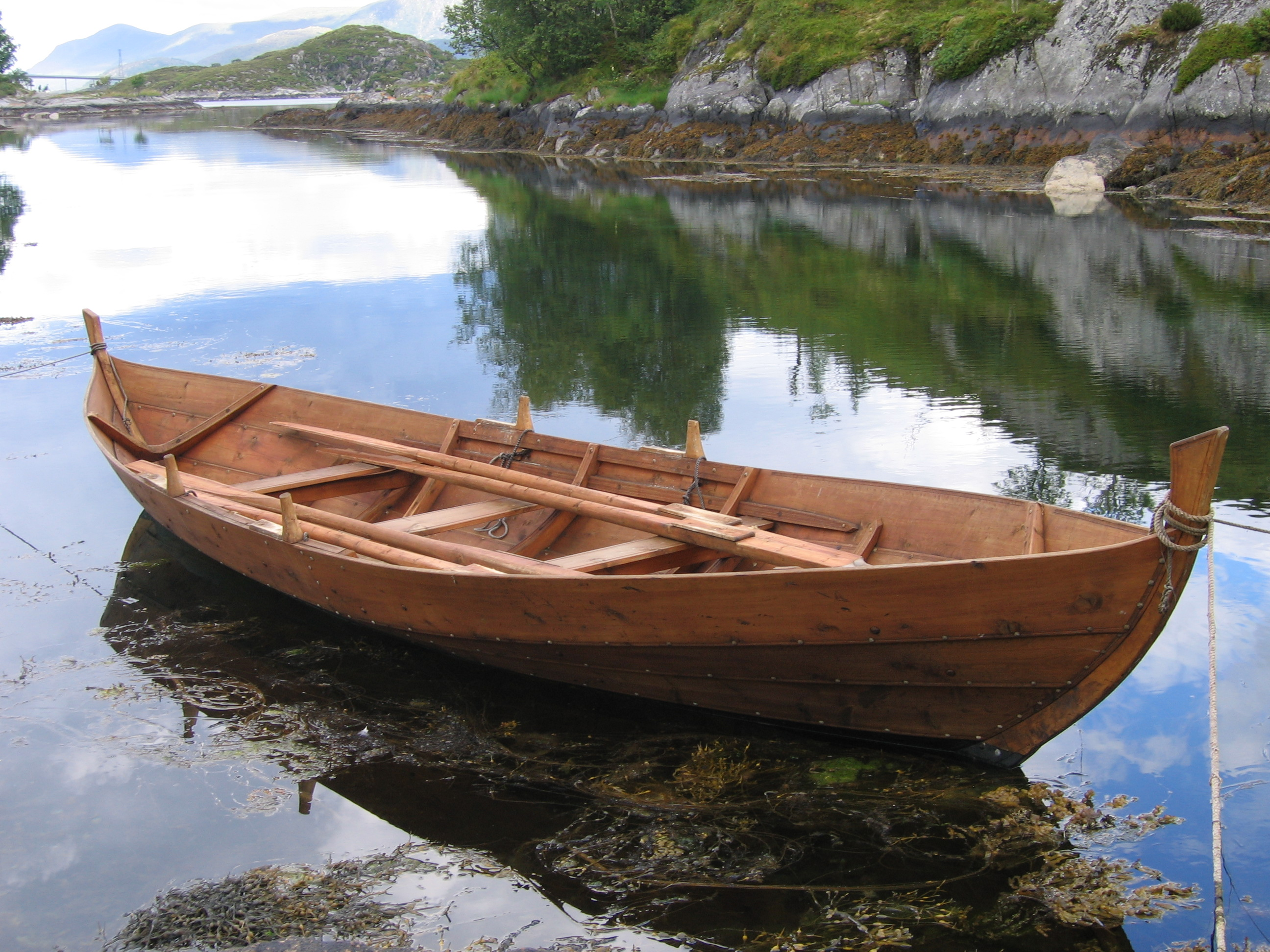
A Norwegian faering, a four-oared boat

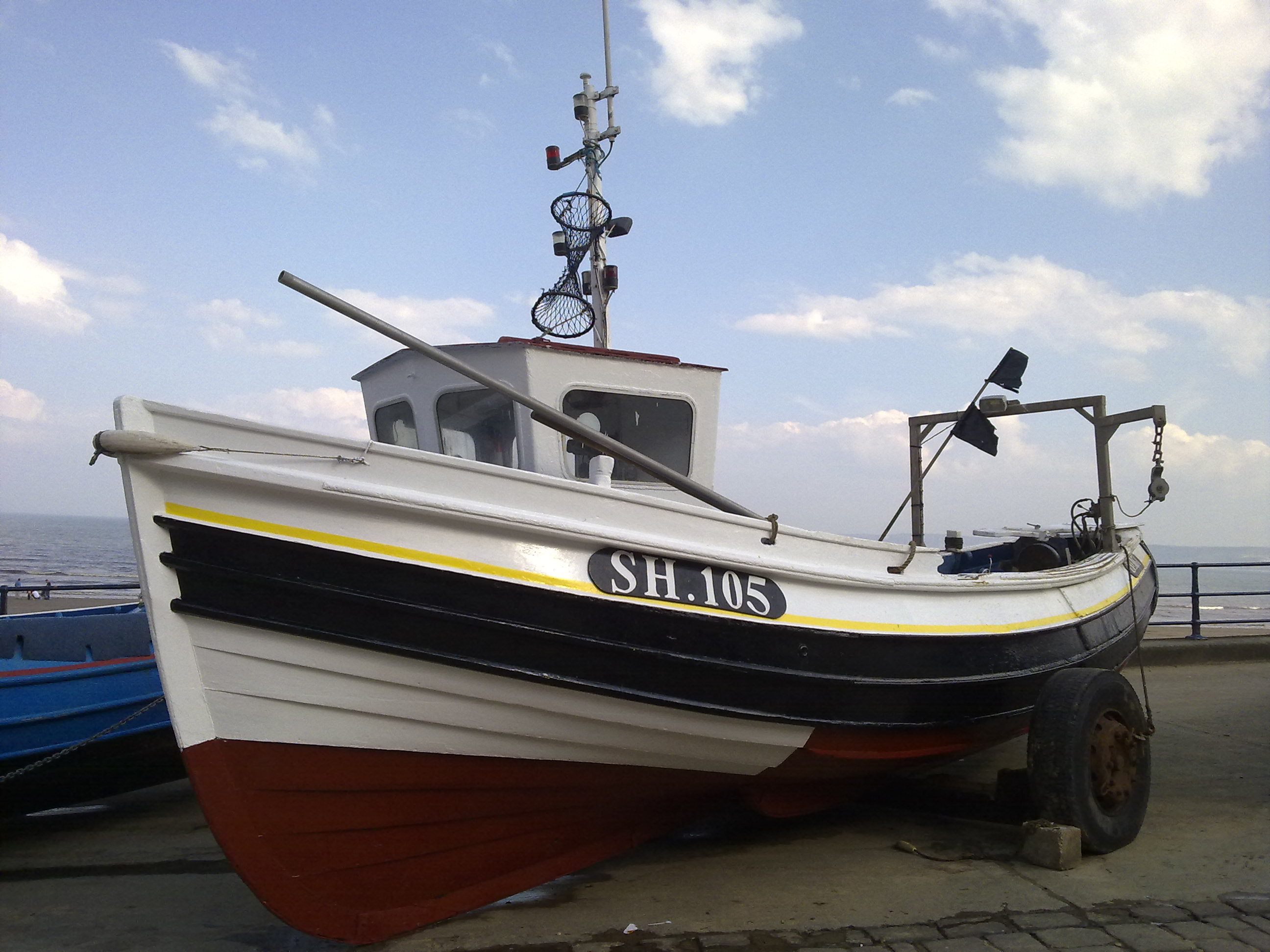
A coble from the Northeast of England

== See also ==
- Classic Boat (magazine)
- Dragon Harald Fairhair (ship)
- Gableboat
- Montagu whaler
- Longship
- Naglfar
- Oselvar
- Rivet
- Yoal
