= V-hull (boat) =

Watercraft design element

A V-hull, is the shape of a boat or ship in which the contours of the hull come in a straight line to the keel. V-hull designs are usually used in smaller boats and are useful in providing space for ballast inside the boat.
