= Thwart =

Seat and structural member of a boat

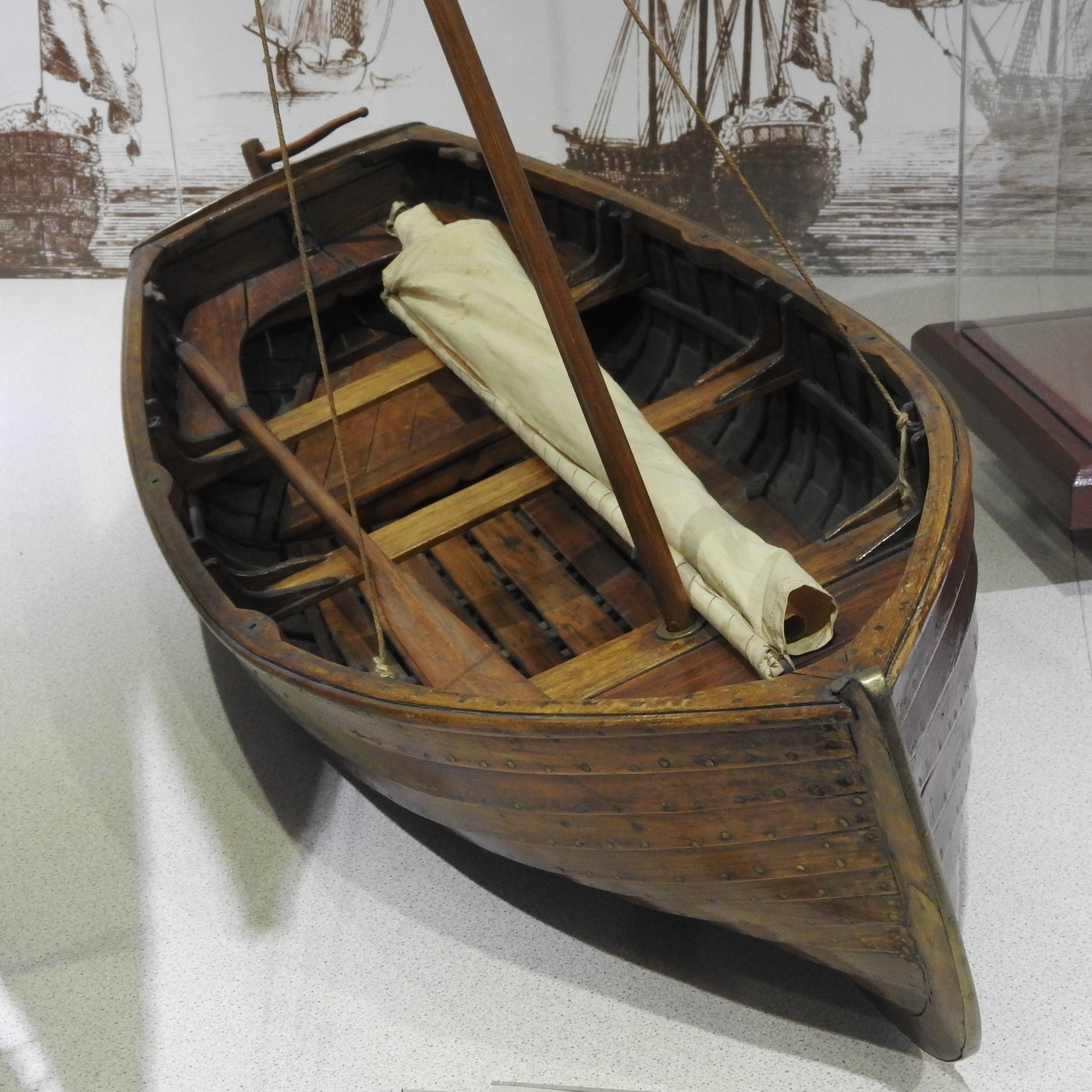
The thwarts in this wooden dinghy are the three seats that go from one side of the hull to the other. The U-shaped arrangement of seats at the stern of the boat are the sternsheets

A thwart is a part of an undecked boat that provides seats for the crew and structural rigidity for the hull. A thwart goes from one side of the hull to the other. There may be just one thwart in a small boat, or many in a larger boat, especially if several oarsmen need to be accommodated.

== General description ==
A thwart is a part of a boat that usually has two functions: as a seat, and as a structural member that provides some rigidity to the hull. A thwart goes from one side of the hull to the other in an open (undecked) boat, and therefore resists forces pushing in or pulling out the sides of the hull. More obviously it provides a seat for an occupant of a boat. In many sailing boats, a thwart may help support the mast. This can be done either by inserting the mast through a hole in the thwart (with the end resting in a mast step on the keel), or the mast may be clamped to one side of a thwart – this makes it easier to step and unstep the mast whilst afloat.

== Under oars ==
In a boat propelled by oars, the thwart has to be positioned with the right geometry for the oar to be worked efficiently and comfortably. Firstly, with a rearward facing oarsman, (Note: The word "rower" is not a sufficient substitute for "oarsman" if one is looking for a gender-neutral term, because of the terminological complexities over the differences in technical meaning of the word "row". Until the English language has an alternative, "oarsman" should be read as including "oarswoman".) the thwart has to be nearer the front of the boat than the pivot point for the oar (which acts as a fulcrum). The usual distance between the after edge of the thwart and the oar's pivot is 10–12 inches (250–300 mm). The next consideration is height. The oarsman has to be positioned so that during the recovery part of the stroke, the oar is above the surface of the water, allowing for the height of waves which the boat might encounter. Since the oarsman is seated, the inner end of the oar cannot go any lower than the top of their thighs – and some clearance is needed for comfort. This usually translates into the top of the thwart needing to be 10–12 inches (250–300 mm) below the point on the gunwale where the oar is pivoted. With these two parameters fixed, the oarsman then needs the support for their feet to be in the right place. As the power of the stroke is delivered, the force applied by the oarsman is reversed in direction by the fulcrum of the oar pivot. The oarsman's feet have to be high enough to take the horizontal component of that force. Especially in larger boats, a footrest or "stretcher" is provided for this. It is usually adjustable for the height of the oarsman. Another consideration for the position of a thwart is the fore and aft distribution of weight in a boat. In a utility sailing dinghy that is being rowed there may be two alternative rowing positions. If a crewmember is steering, the rower sits on a forward thwart, thereby distributing the weight around the boat evenly – but if the rower is alone, better balance may be achieved using a thwart that is further aft.

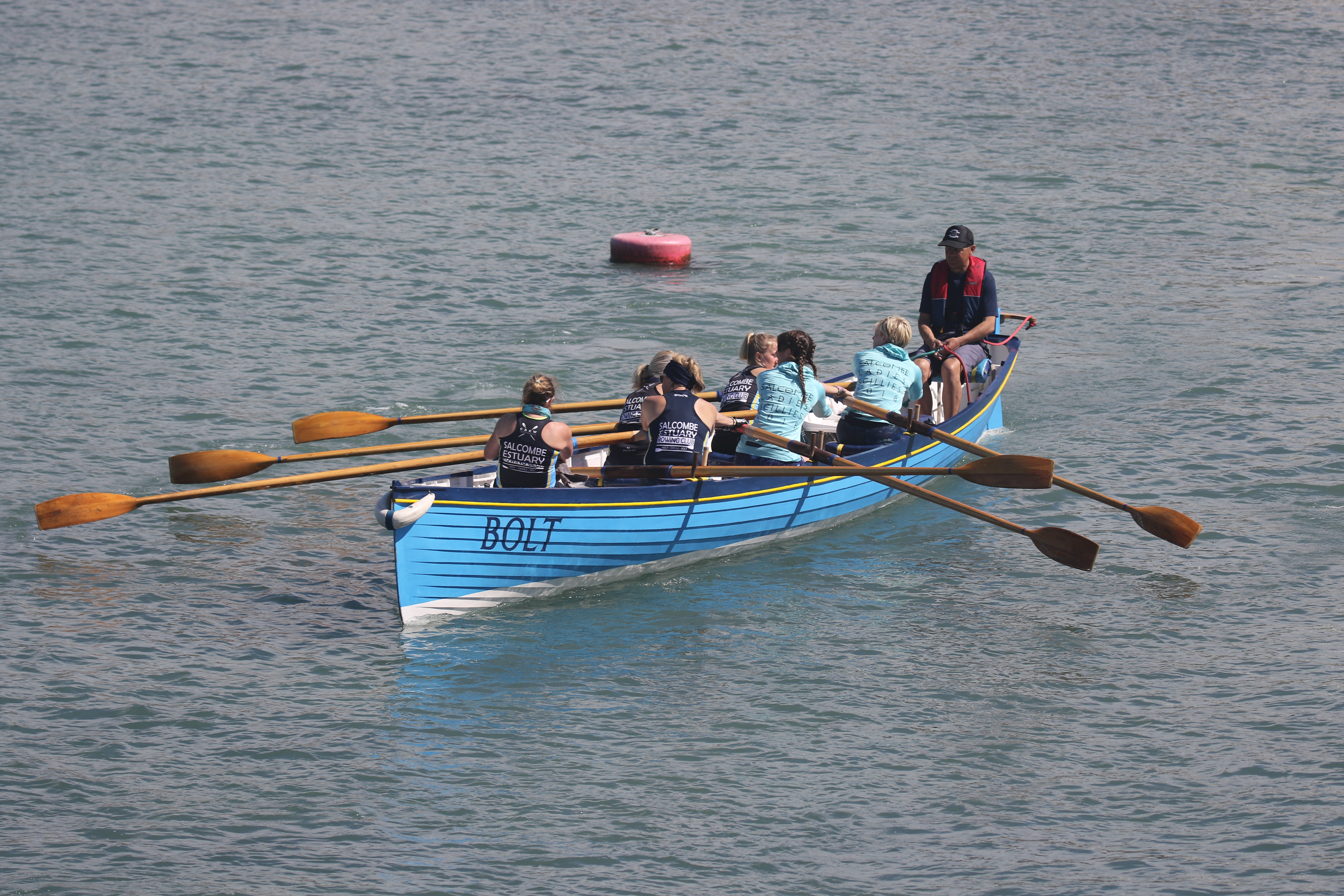
A Cornish pilot gig, a single banked boat

Thwarts in a boat worked under oars may be described as either "single banked" or "double banked". With a single banked arrangement, there is one oarsman seated on each thwart, each of whom is working only one oar. The oars alternate on each side along the length of the boat. This allows a boat to be reasonably narrow and yet still have ample length of oar inboard of the gunwale (the oarsman can sit off the centre line of the boat to maximise this length). A double banked boat has two oarsmen seated on each thwart, each of whom operates their own oar on their own side of the boat. This is generally found in larger boats. A third arrangement is where two oars, one each side of the boat, are worked by one person. (Technically, in salt water, this is the only use of an oar that is termed "rowing". In inland waters, it is termed "sculling" and "rowing" means working a single oar. This strict and contradictory terminology is not always adhered to.)

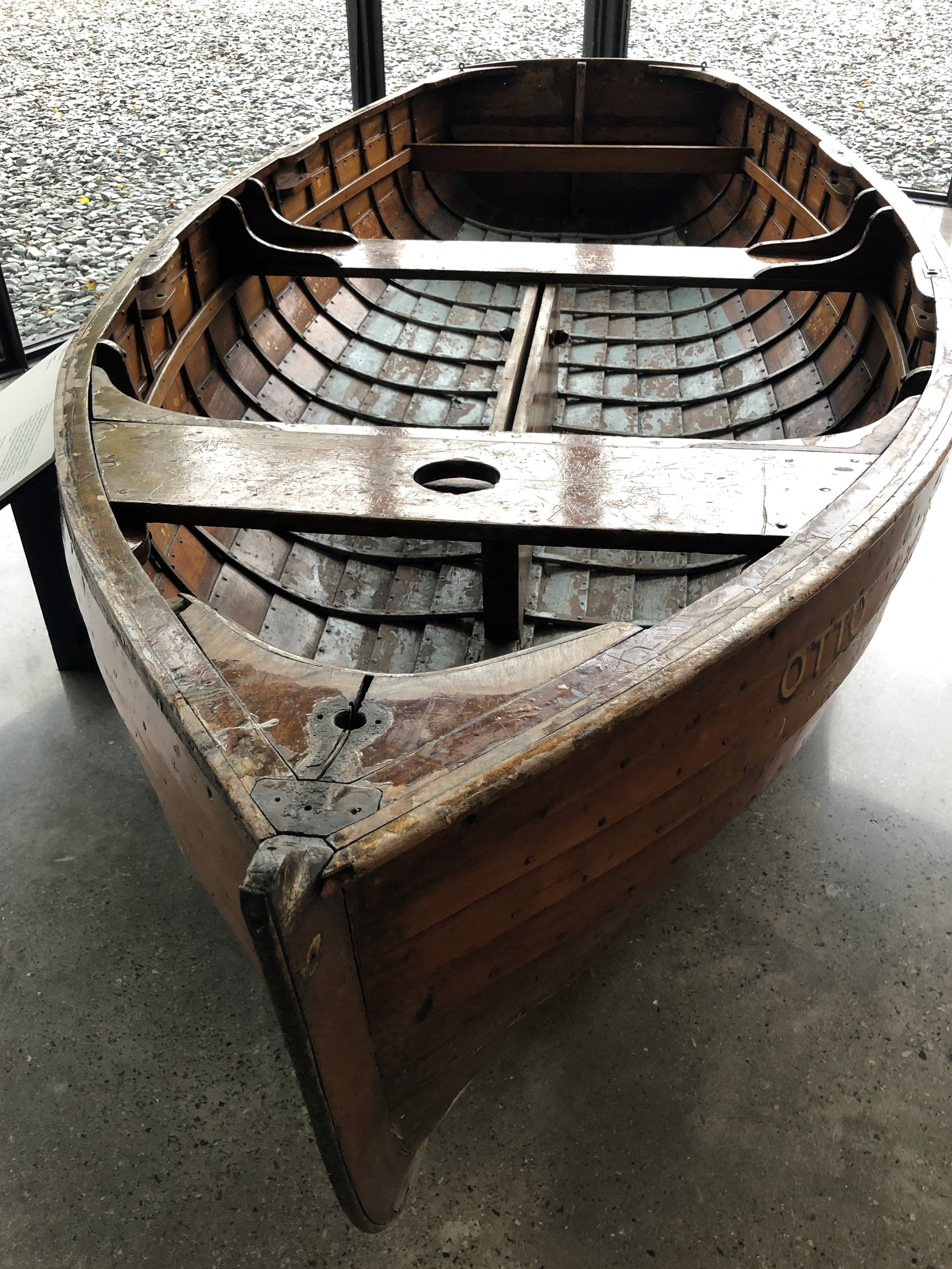
Clinker built dinghy showing some of the basic structural details. The single rowing thwart supports the aft end of the centre-board case. The pairs of knees at each end of the thwart can be seen; also the longitudinal stringer on which the thwart rests. A mast thwart, nearer the bows, is set at a higher level and has a hole through which the mast is placed,

== Structural aspects ==
Most commonly, a thwart is a single timber plank. It usually needs to be firmly attached to the hull. In a traditional wooden construction it usually sits upon, and is fastened to, a longitudinal stringer which is sometimes called a shelf. The joint between hull and thwart is often reinforced with pairs of knees. (Note: A knee is an approximately L-shaped piece of timber used to reinforce a traditional hull) Traditionally, knees are grown to the required shape, so that the grain follows the shape. In modern construction, glued laminated timber knees may be used. In larger boats, the centre of the thwart is supported with a pillar that goes down to the keel. In a sailing dinghy, all or some of the thwarts may be built in with the structure of the centre-board case.

In lightly-built whaleboats, the thwarts deliberately had a slight upwards bend in the middle. This meant that if the hull received a blow on the side, it could momentarilty flex slightly as the thwarts bent slightly more – without this, the force of the blow would punch a thwart through the side of the hull, making a large hole.

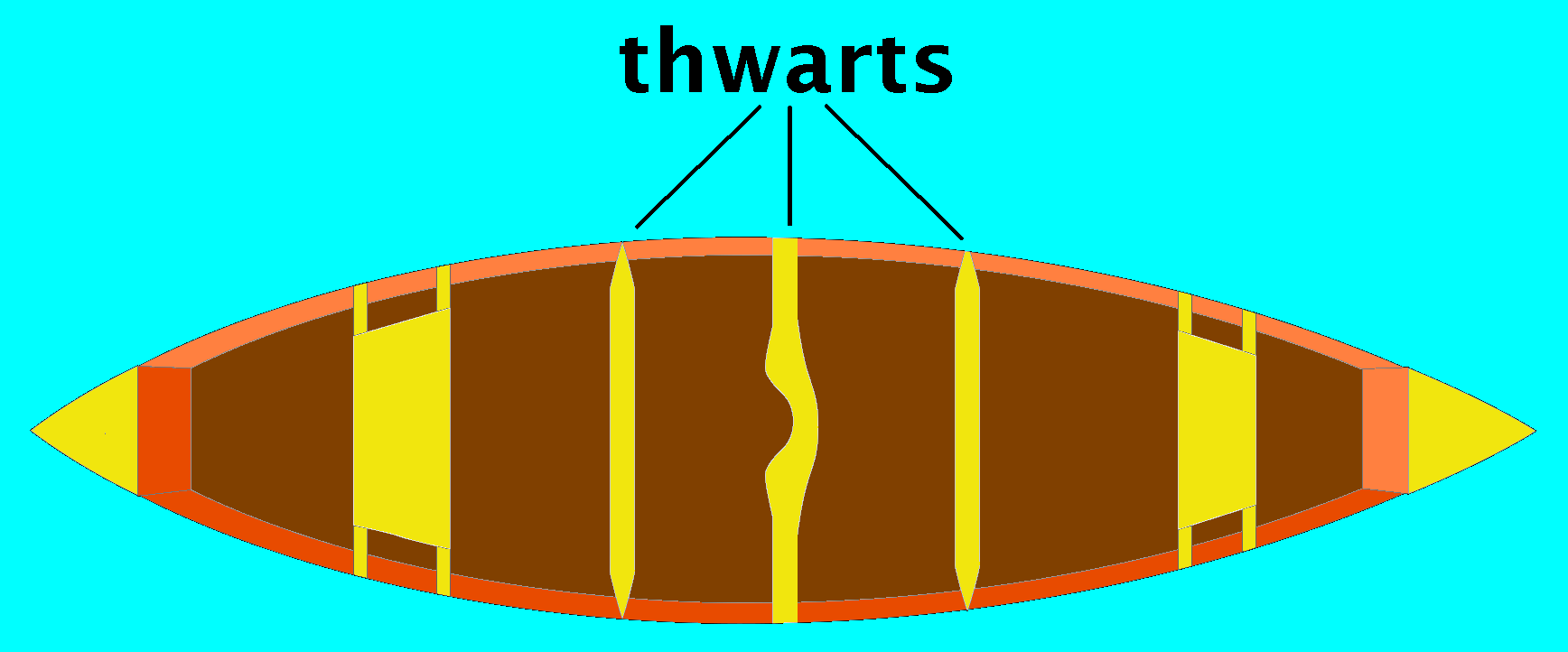
Drawing of a canoe showing thwarts. The centre thwart, shaped like a yoke, serves as a carrying pole.

In a canoe, a thwart is simply a strut placed crosswise (left/right) in a ship or boat, serving only as a structural member or to help with carrying. Some inflatable boats have a solid thwart which can be folded and removed so the boat can be deflated and rolled up for transport or storage.
