= Gunwale =

Top edge of the hull of a ship or boat

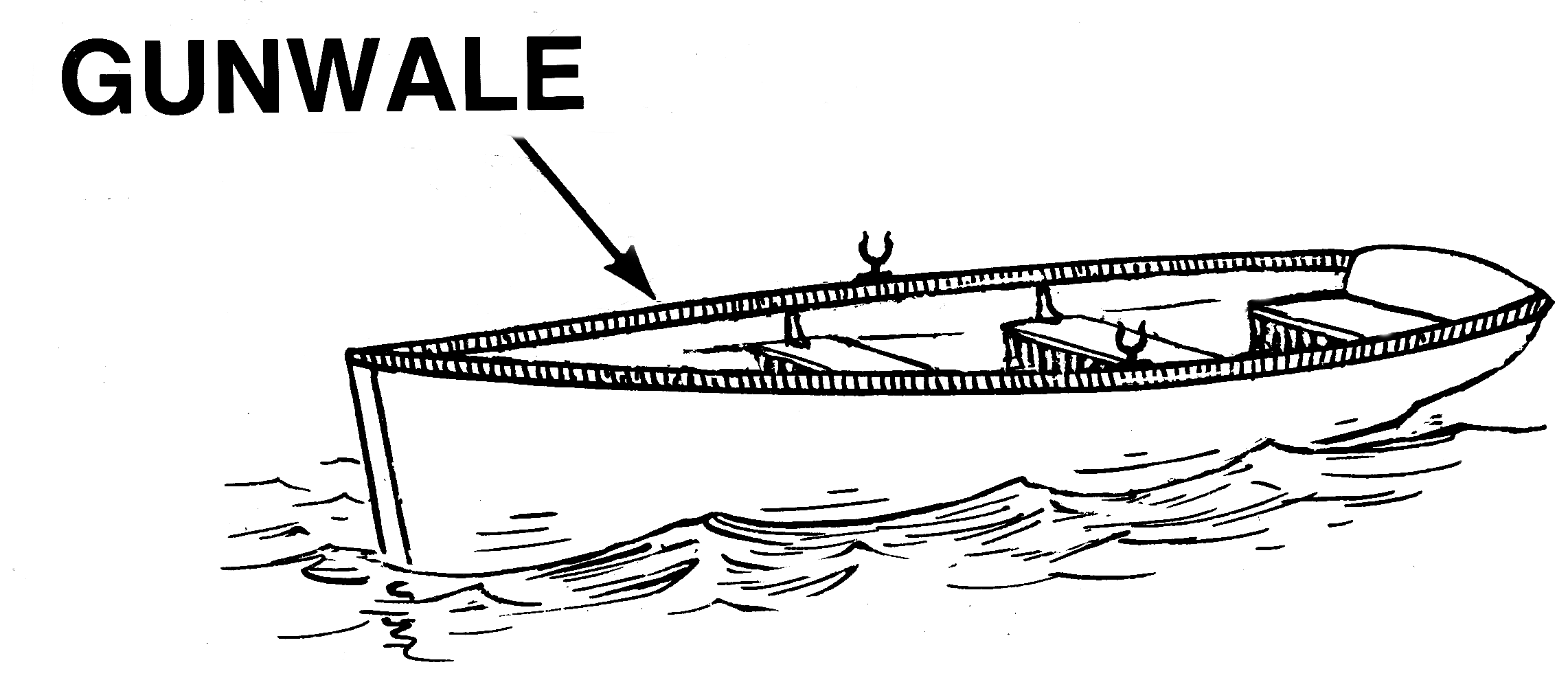
The gunwale of an undecked boat

The gunwale (/ˈɡʌnəl/) is the top edge of the hull of a ship or boat.

Originally the structure was the "gun wale" on a sailing warship, a horizontal reinforcing band added at and above the level of a gun deck to offset the stresses created by firing artillery. Over time it remained as a valuable stiffener mounted inboard of the sheer strake on commercial and recreational craft. In modern boats, it is the top edge of the hull where there is usually some form of stiffening, often in the form of traditional wooden boat construction members called the "inwale" and "outwale".

On a canoe, the gunwale is typically the widened edge at the top of its hull, reinforced with wood, plastic or aluminum, to carry the thwarts.

On a narrowboat or canal boat, the gunwale is synonymous with the side deck—a narrow ledge running the full length of the craft.

== See also ==
- Freeboard
