= Royal Academy Exhibition of 1866 =

1866 art exhibition in London

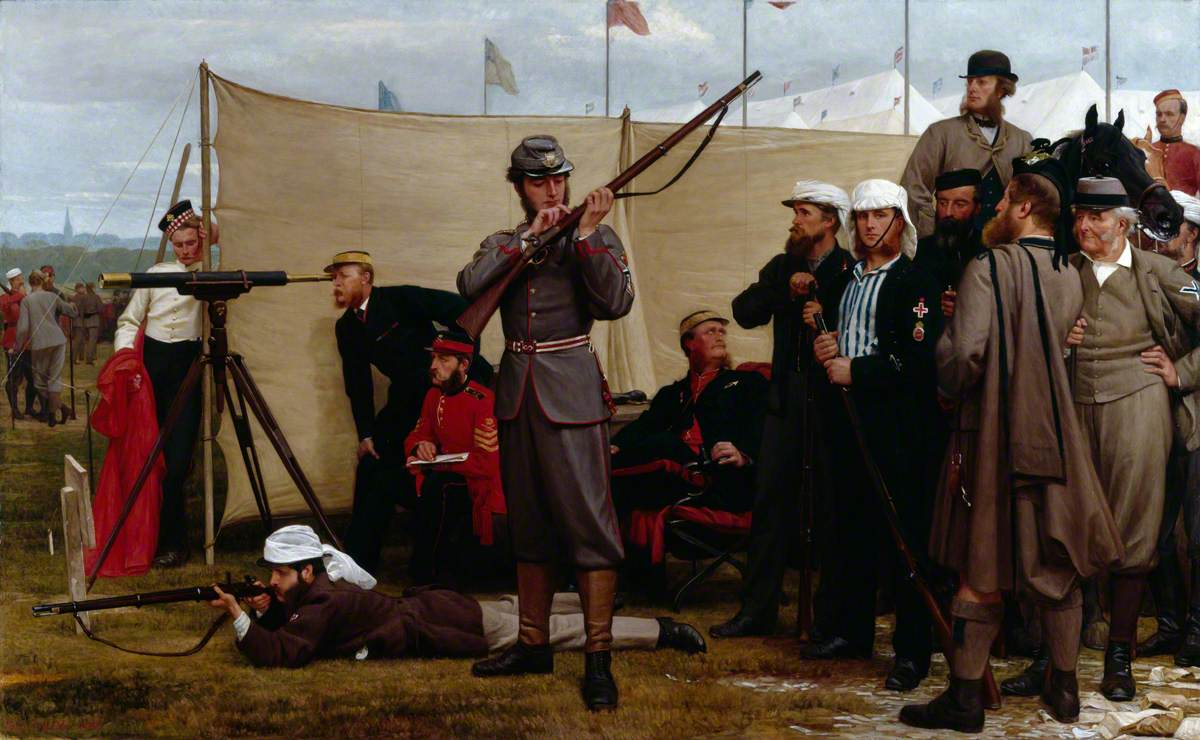
Volunteers at a Firing Point by Henry Tanworth Wells

The Royal Academy Exhibition of 1866 was the ninety eighth annual Summer Exhibition of the British Royal Academy of Arts. It was held at the National Gallery in London from 7 May to 28 July 1866. One of the most notable works on display was the Irish artist Daniel Maclise's The Death of Nelson, an oil painting based on the fresco he had produced for the Houses of Parliament. It was the first exhibition during the Presidency of Francis Grant, in succession to Charles Lock Eastlake. The same year the Academy began its protracted move to a new permanent home at Burlington House in Piccadilly.

Paintings on display included Uncle Toby and the Widow Wadman by William Powell Frith and The Woodman's Dinner by Richard Redgrave. Edwin Landseer displayed The Arab Tent and Lady Godiva's Prayer while Henry Tanworth Wells exhibited Volunteers at a Firing Point, his diploma work for membership of the Royal Academy.

The Scottish artist Peter Graham made his debut with the landscape painting A Spate in the Highlands which showed a flood in the Highlands and drew critical acclaim.

== Gallery ==
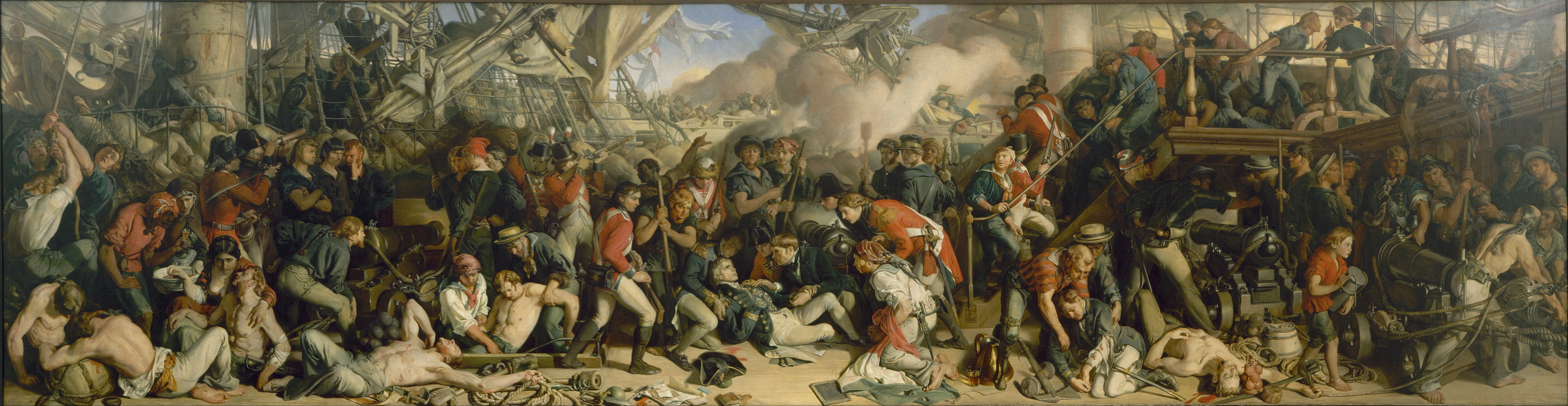
The Death of Nelson by Daniel Maclise

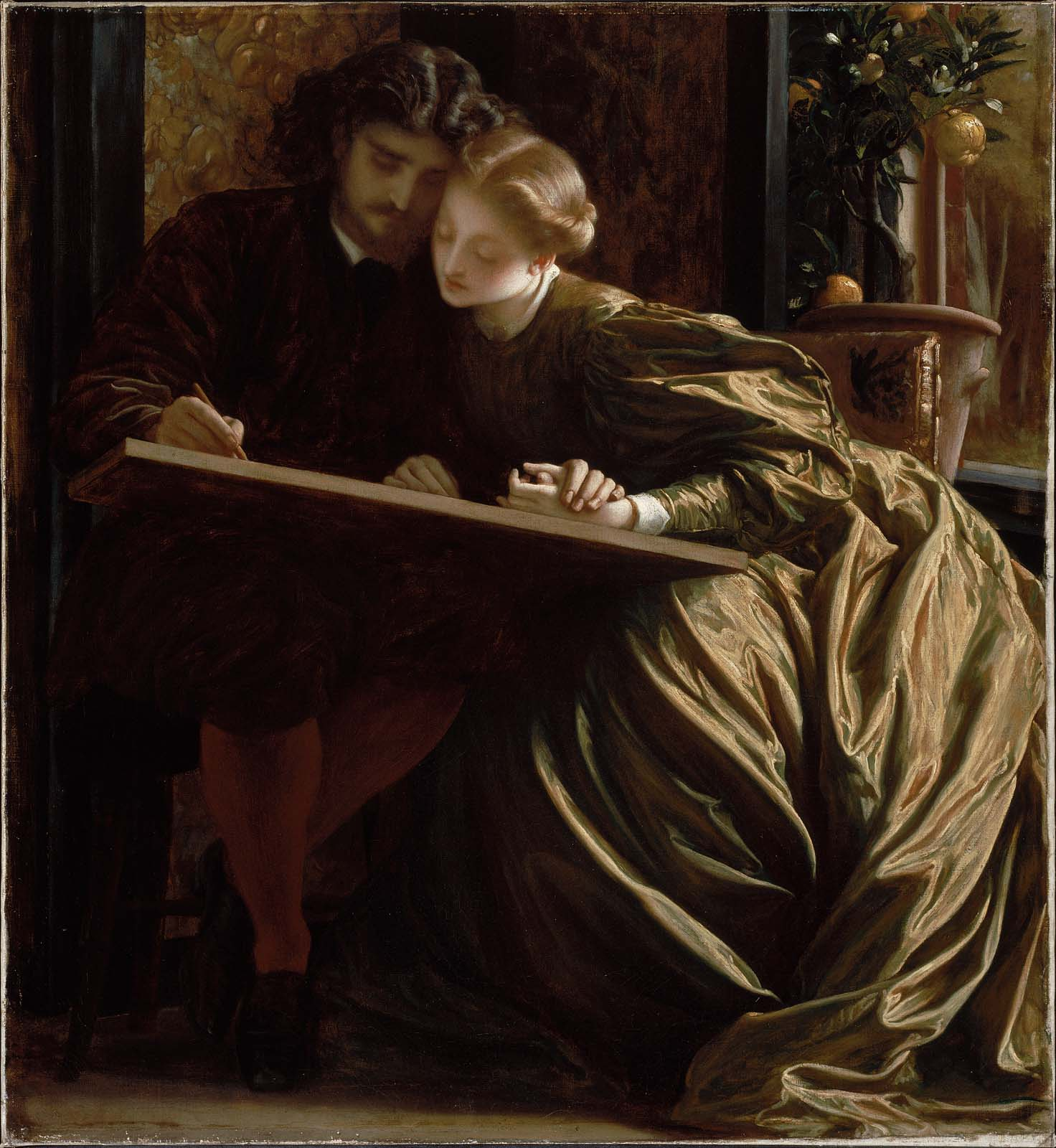
The Painter's Honeymoon by Frederic Leighton

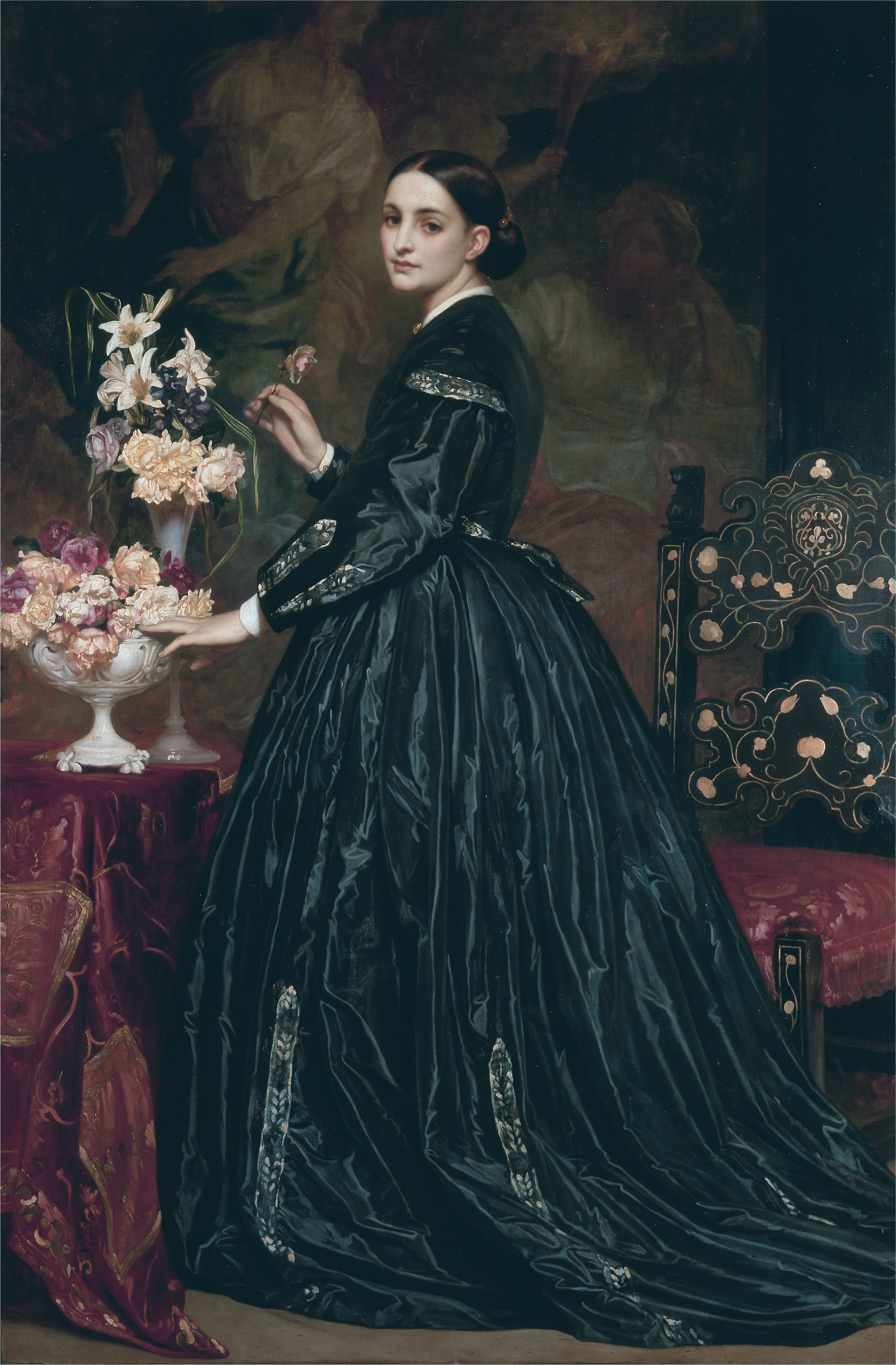
Portrait of Elinor Guthrie by Frederic Leighton

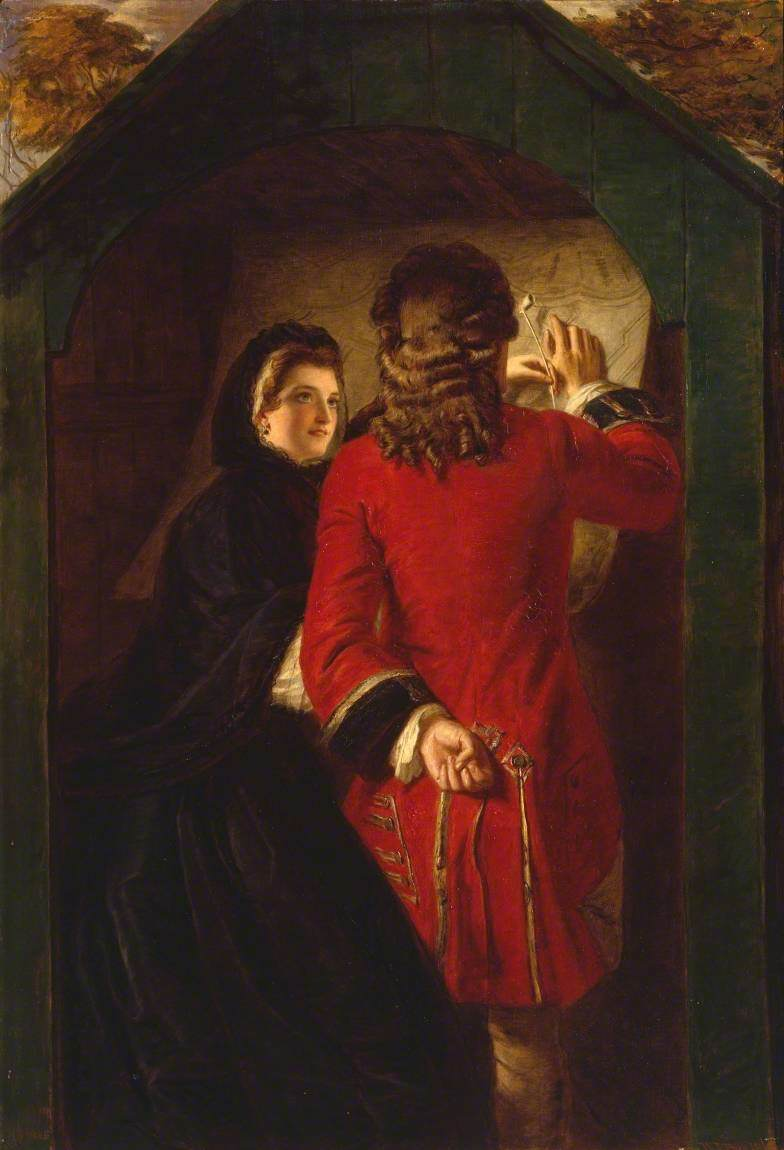
Uncle Toby and the Widow Wadman by William Powell Frith

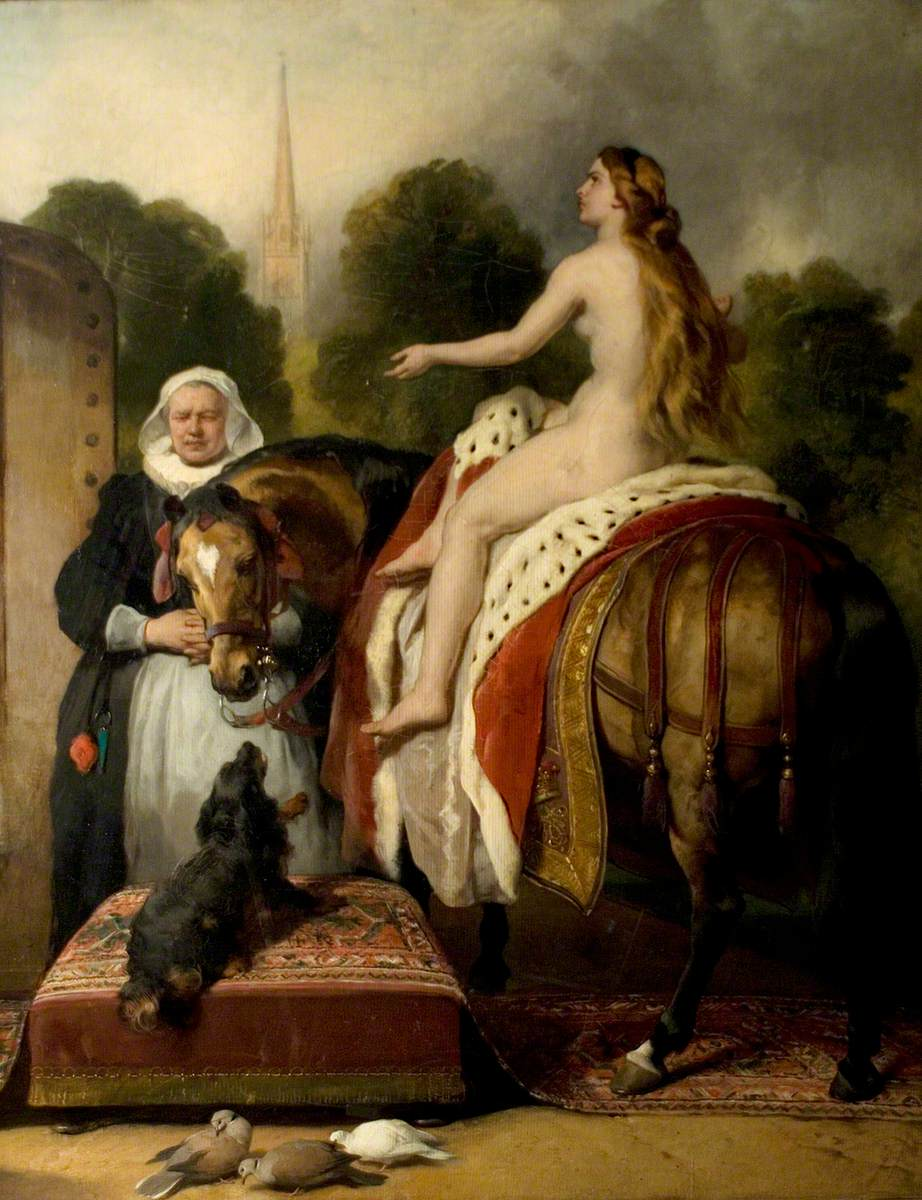
Lady Godiva's Prayer by Edwin Landseer

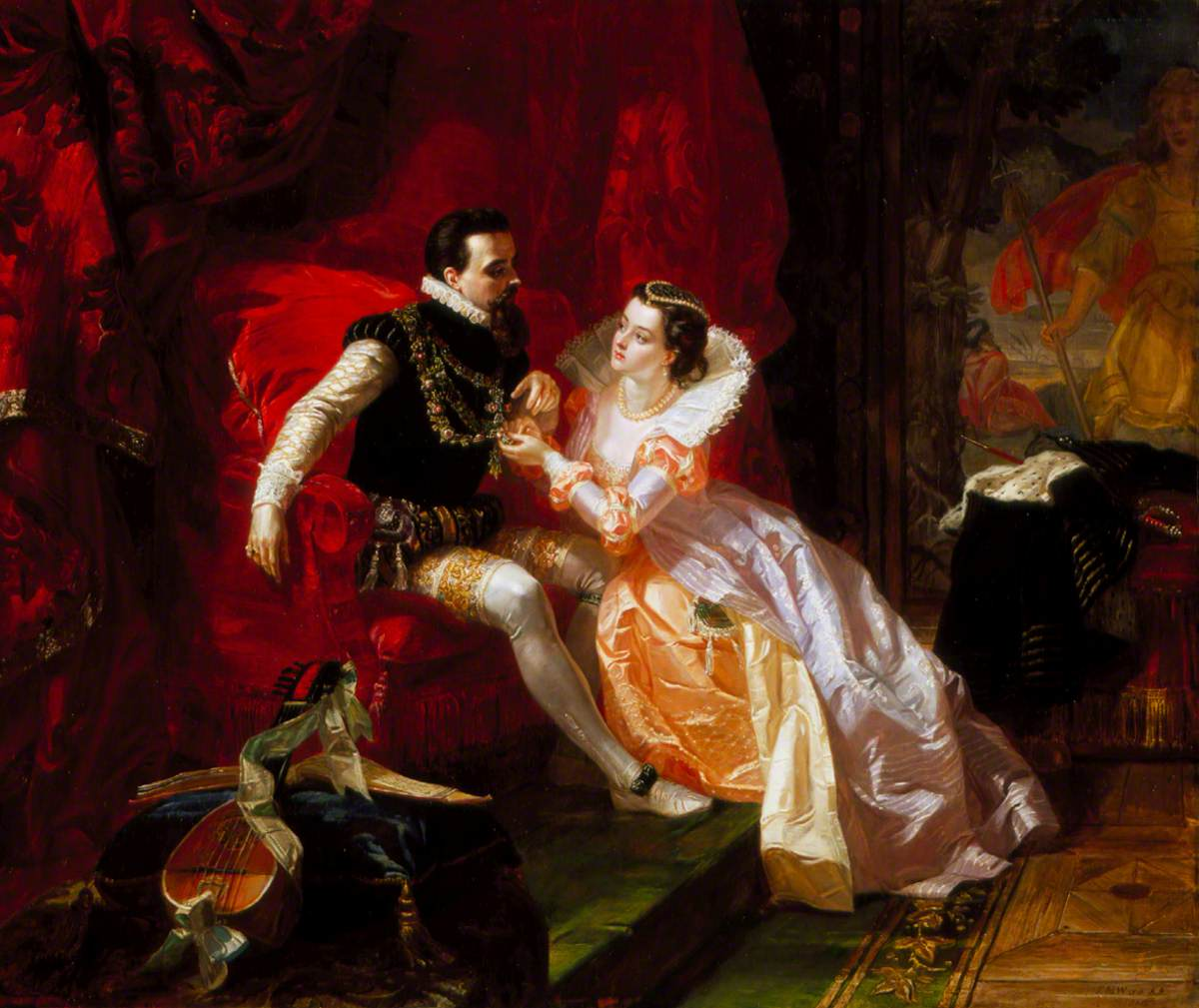
Leicester and Amy Robsart at Cumnor Hall by Edward Matthew Ward

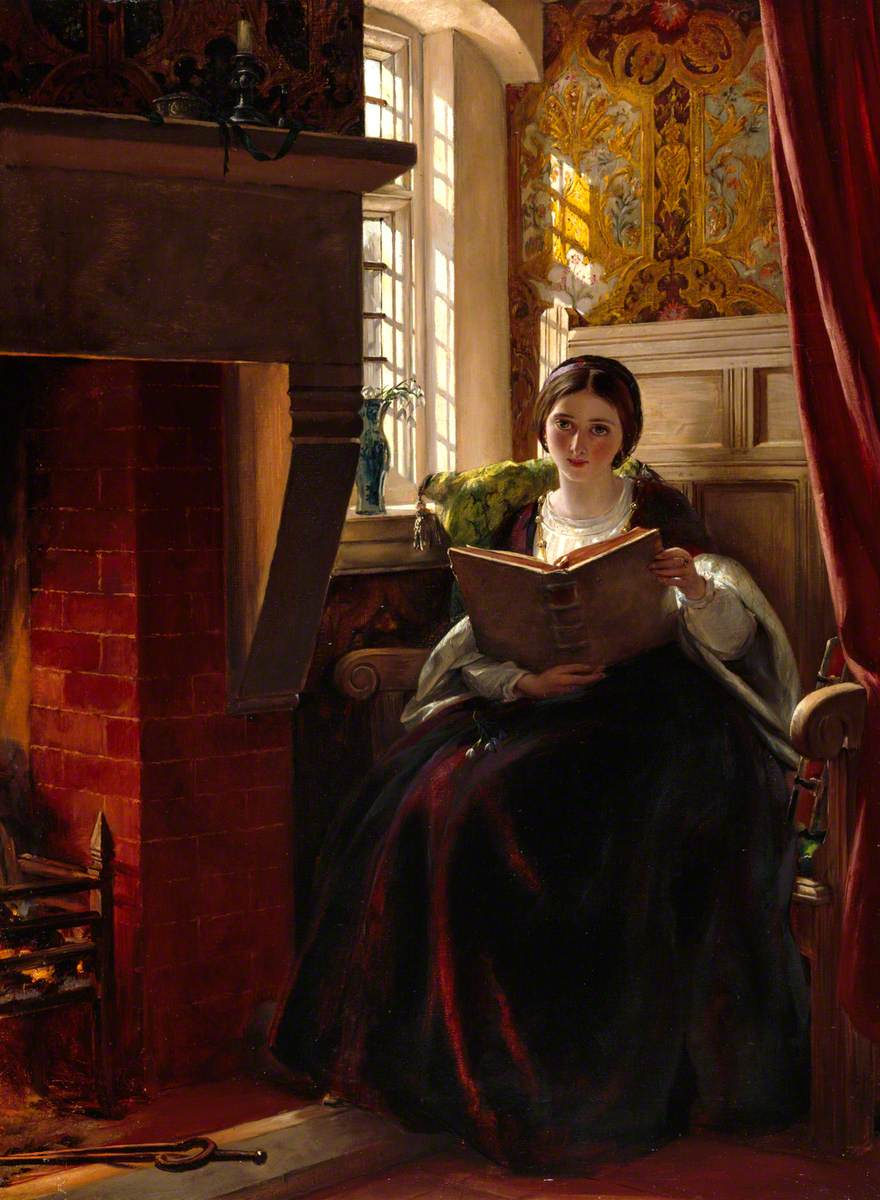
A Pleasant Corner by John Callcott Horsley

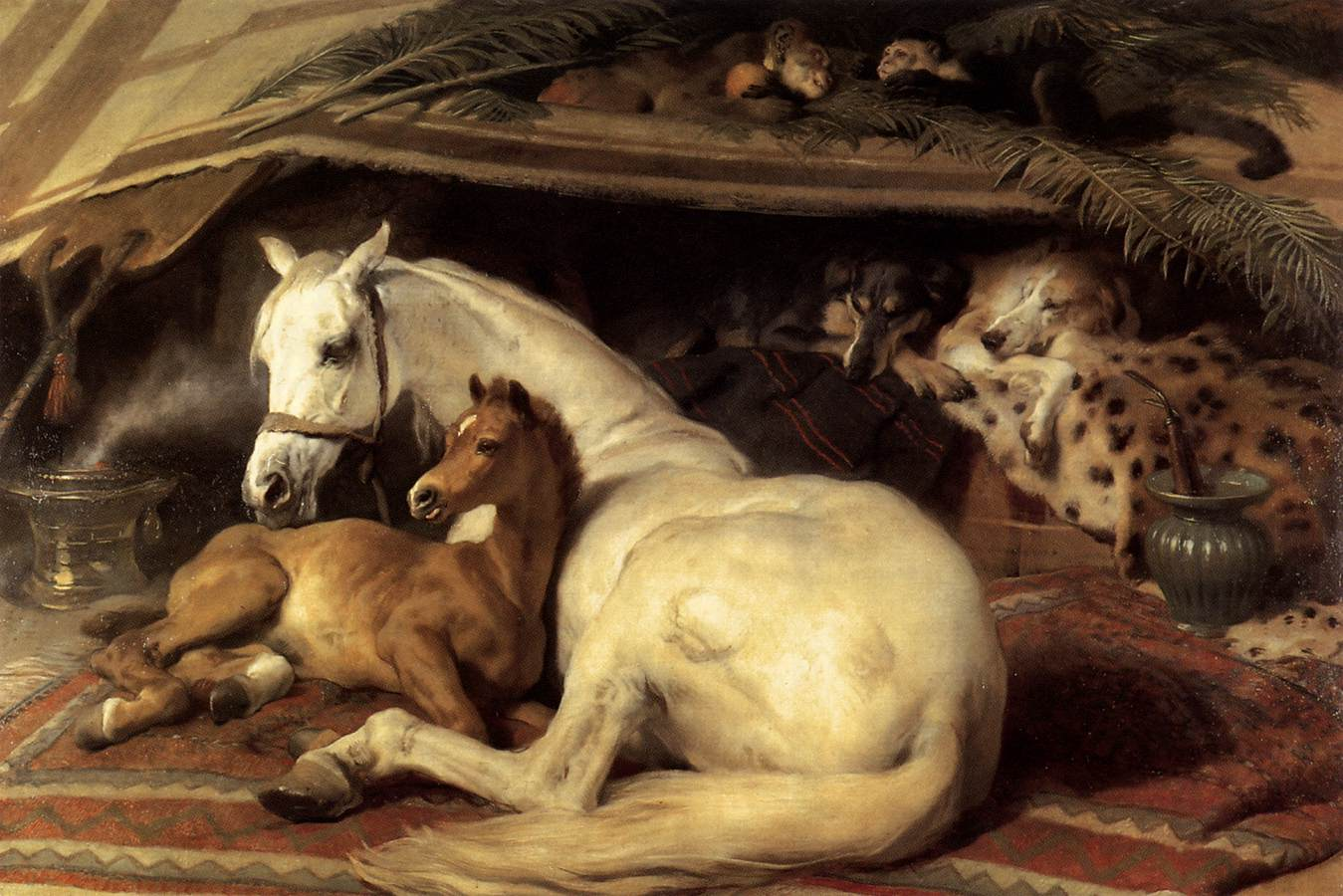
The Arab Tent by Edwin Landseer

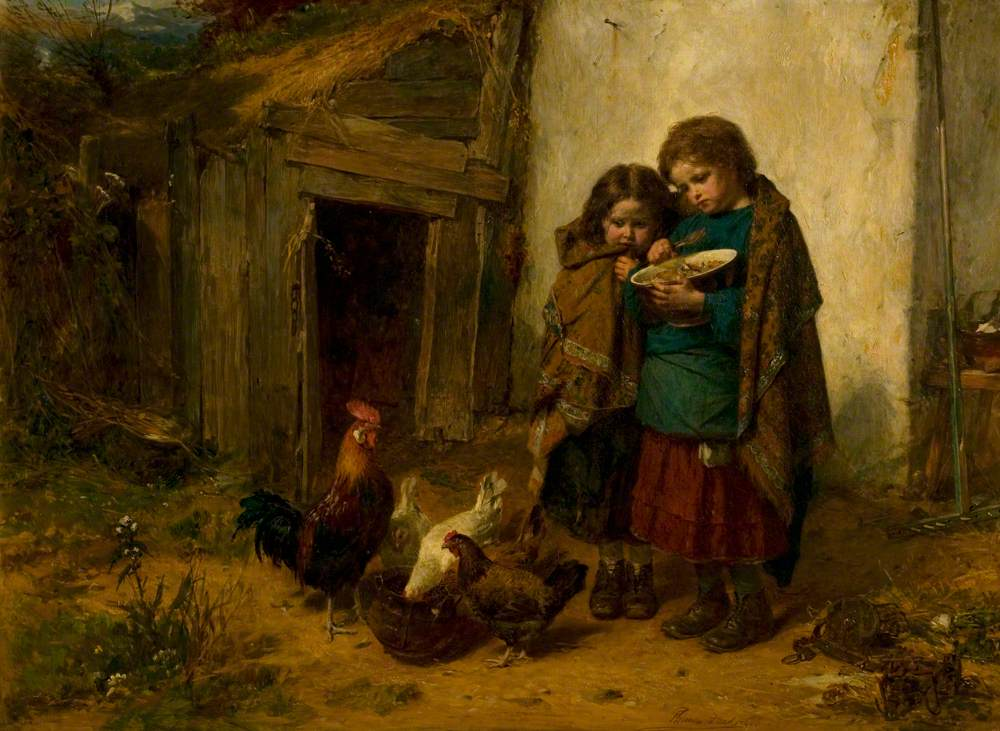
Pot Luck by Thomas Faed

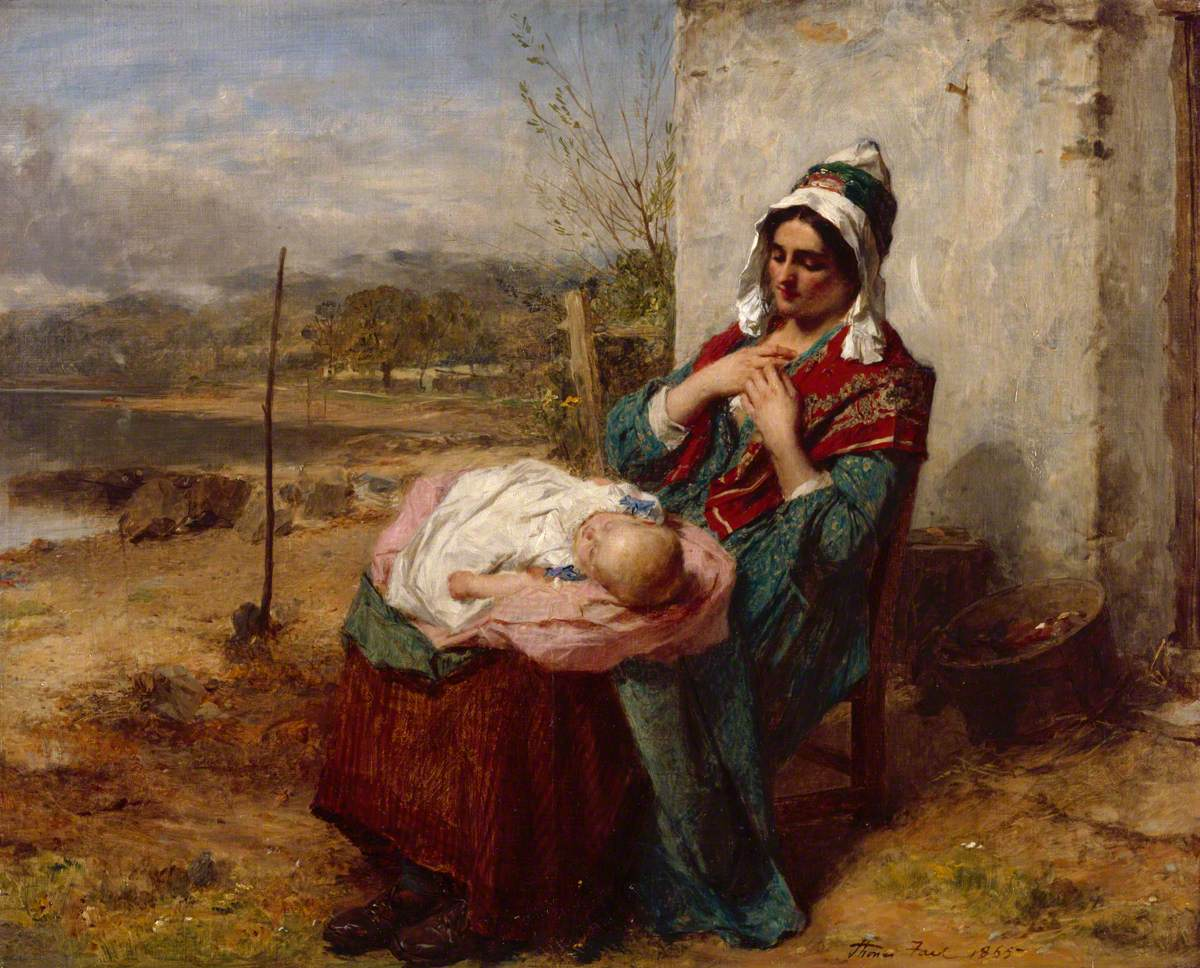
Ere Care Begins by Thomas Faed

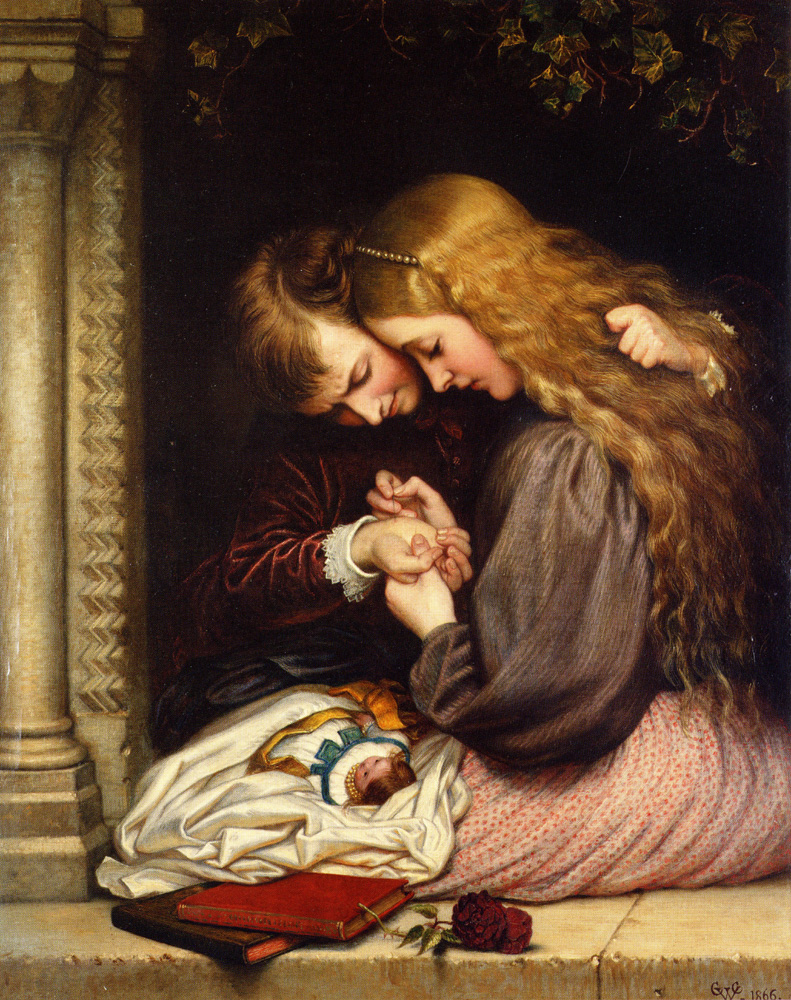
The Thorn by Charles West Cope

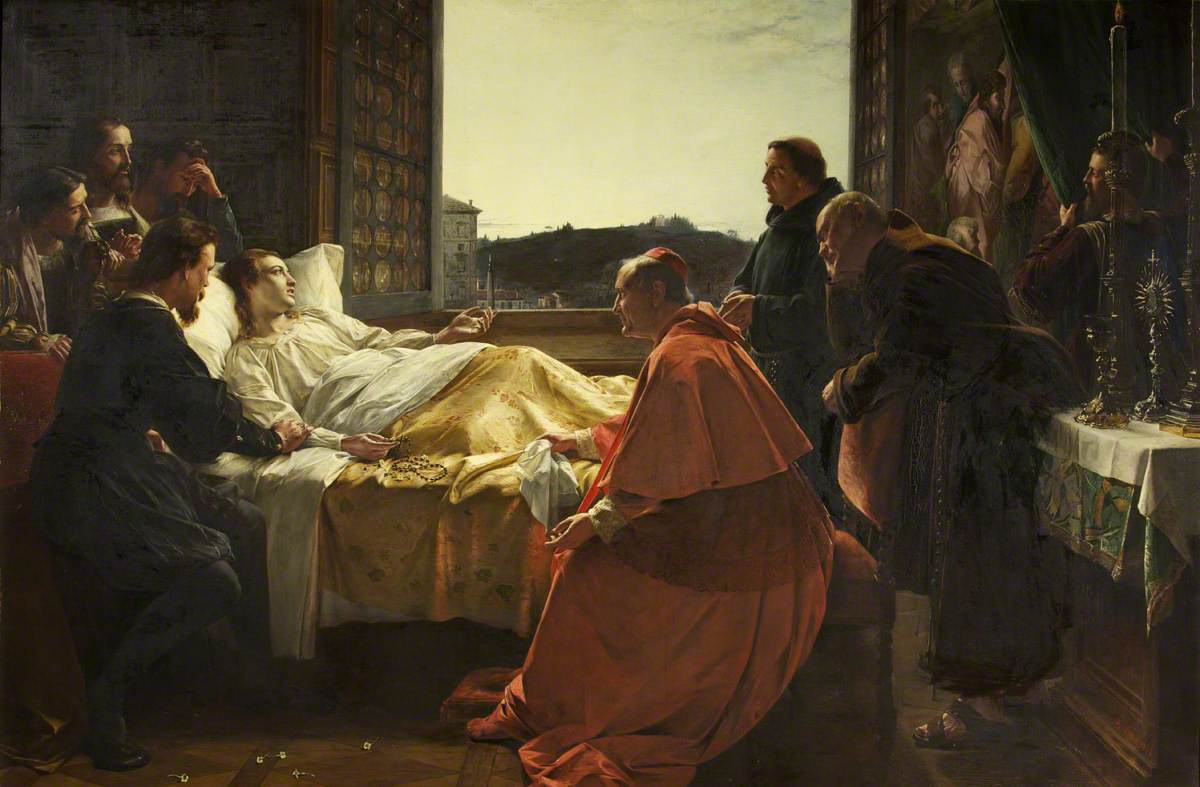
The Last Moments of Raphael by Henry Nelson O'Neil

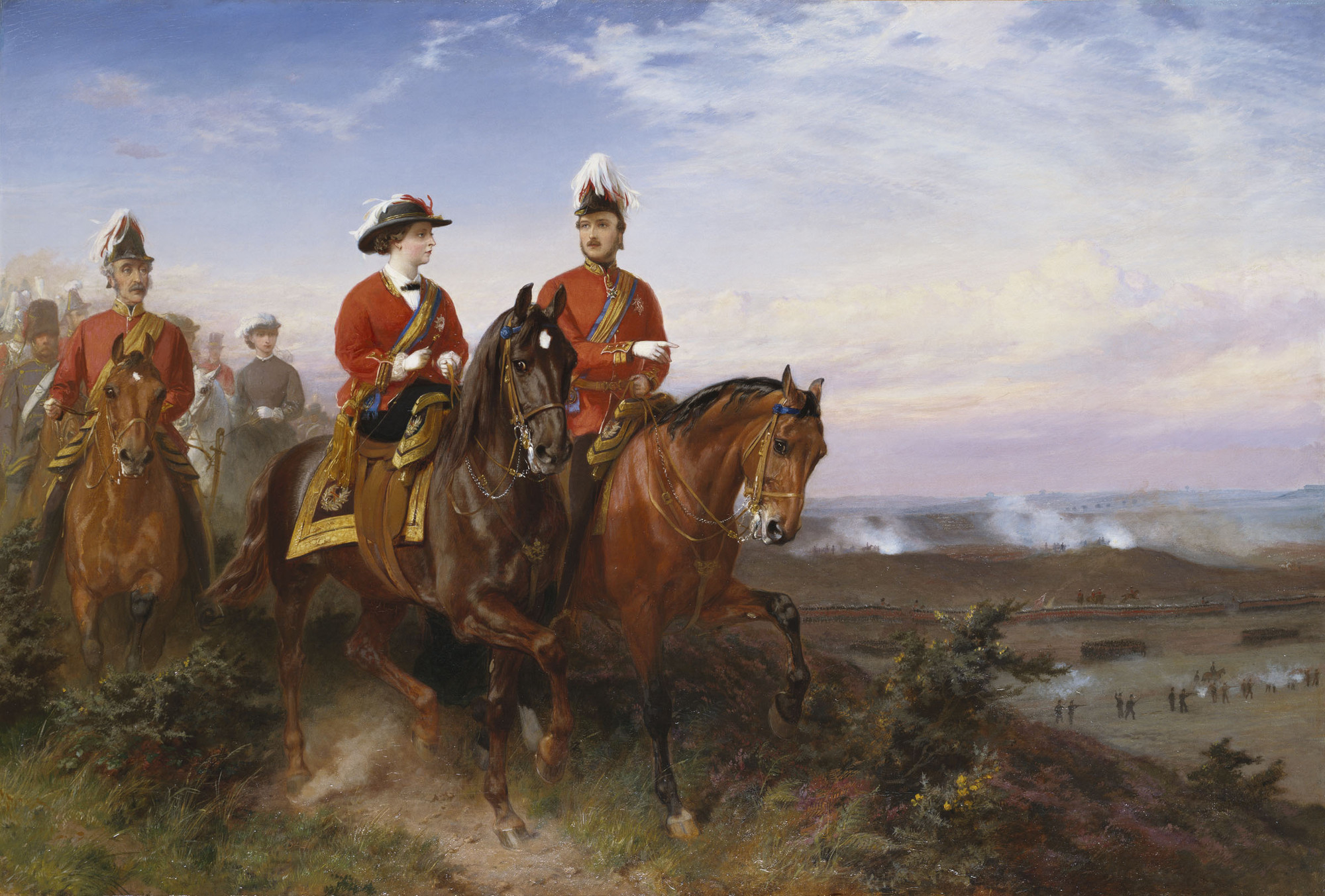
Queen Victoria and the Prince Consort at Aldershot by George Housman Thomas

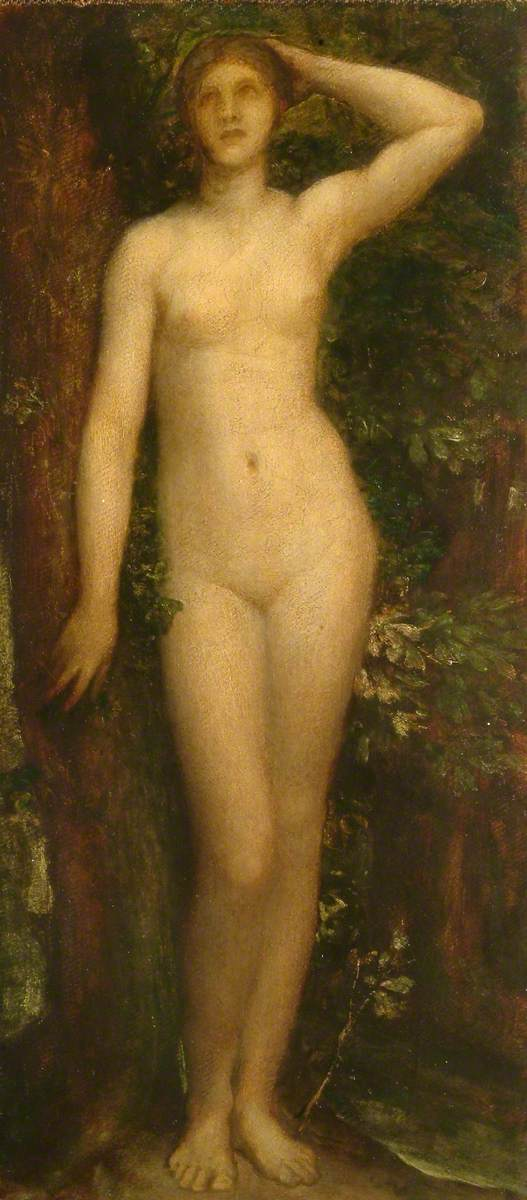
Thetis by George Frederic Watts

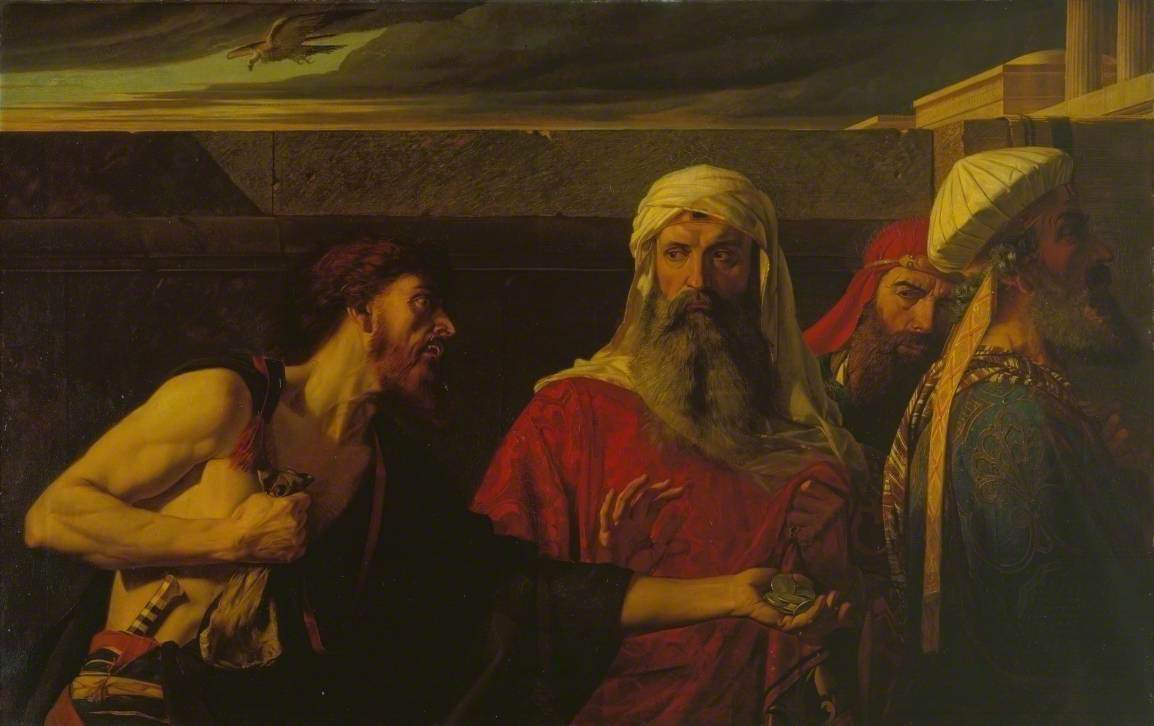
The Remorse of Judas by Edward Armitage

Solitude by Frederick Richard Lee

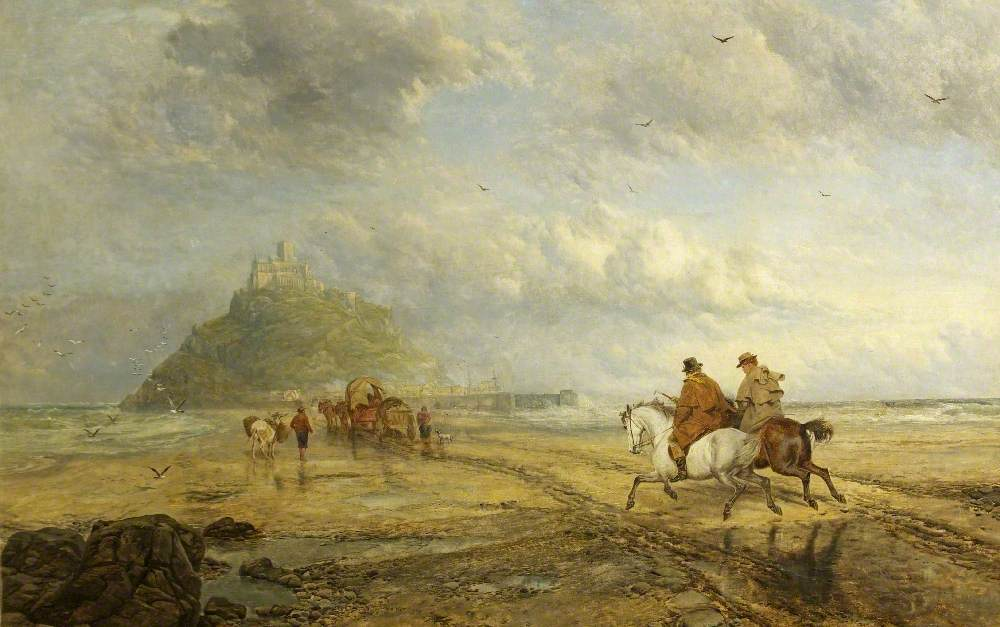
A Breezy Day on the English Coast by Thomas Creswick

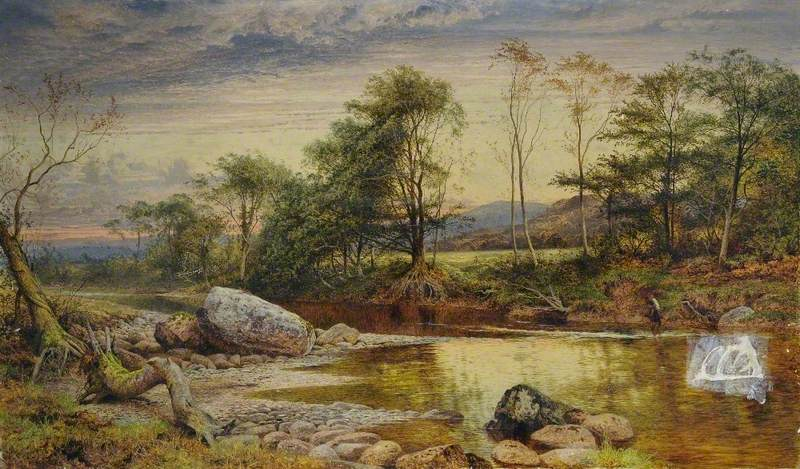
The Close of Summer by Benjamin Williams Leader

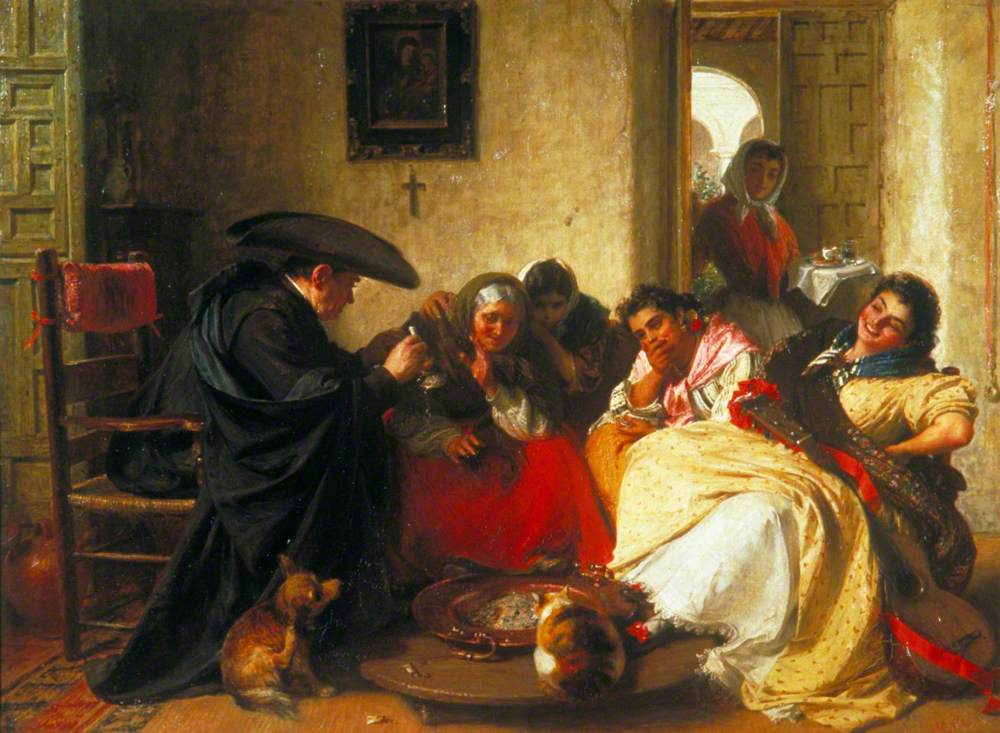
A Chat Round the Brasero by John Phillip

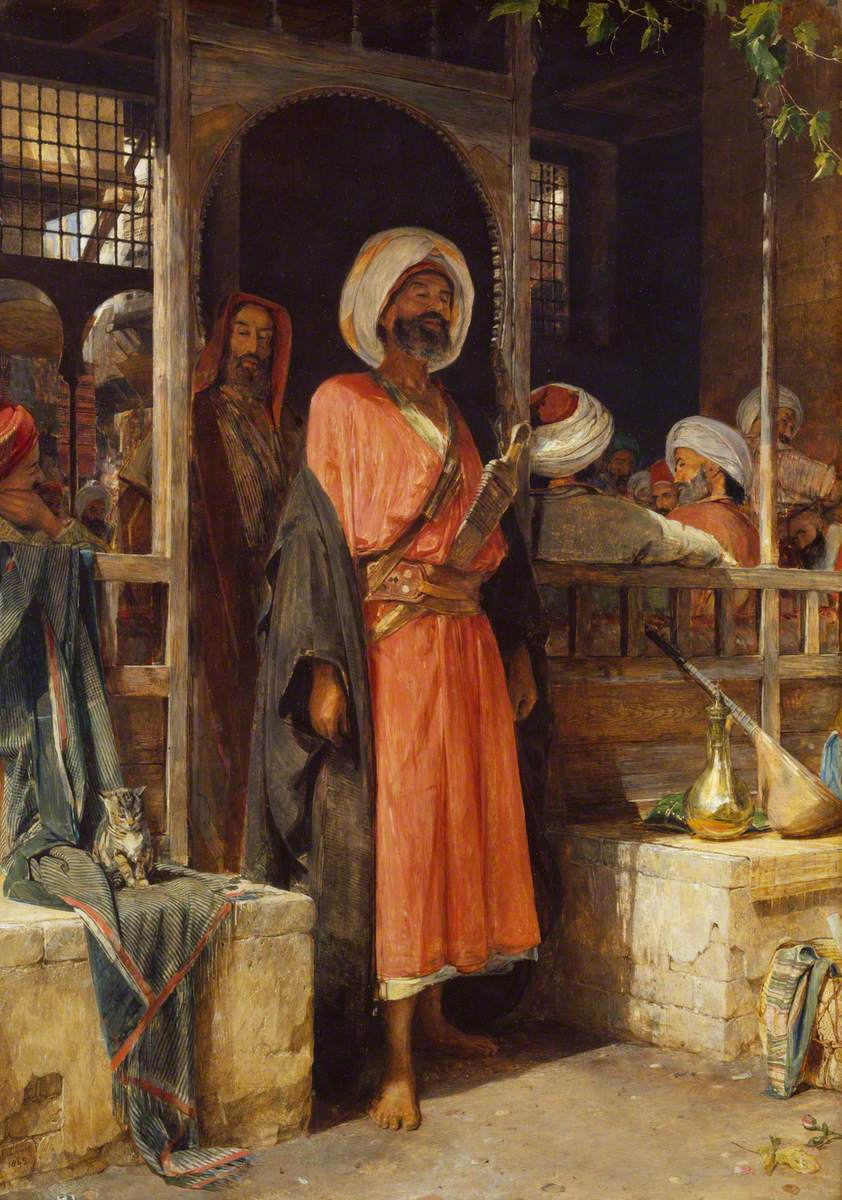
The Door of a Café in Cairo by John Frederick Lewis

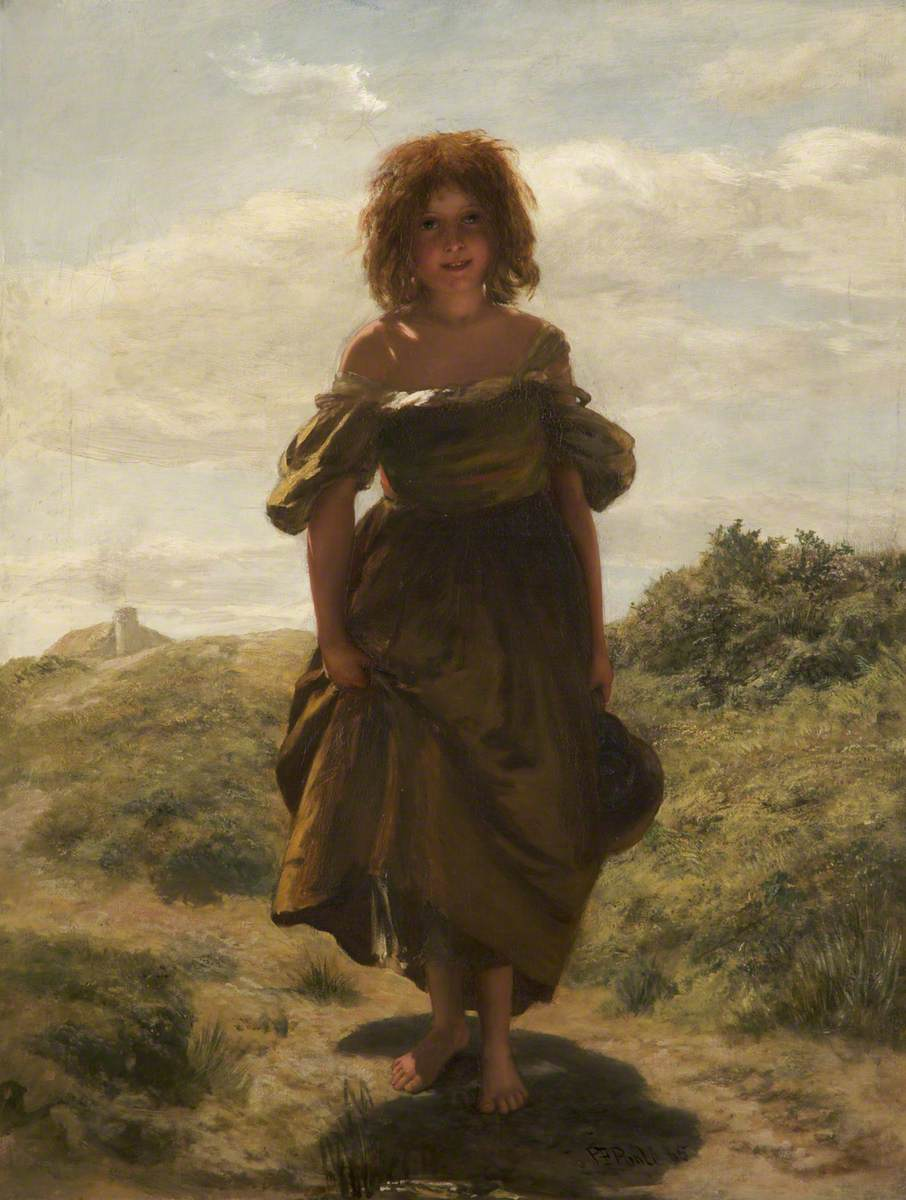
Going to the Spring by Paul Falconer Poole

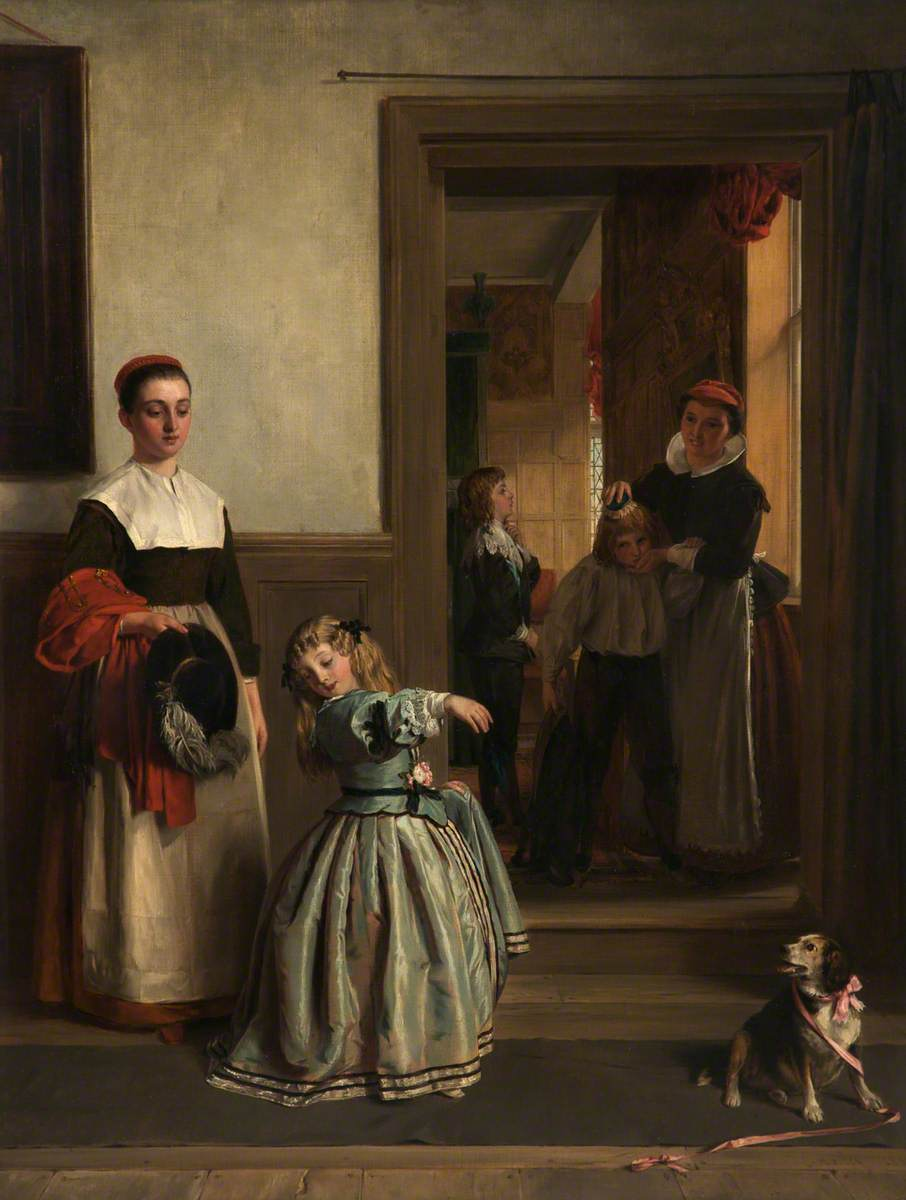
Going to a Party by John Callcott Horsley

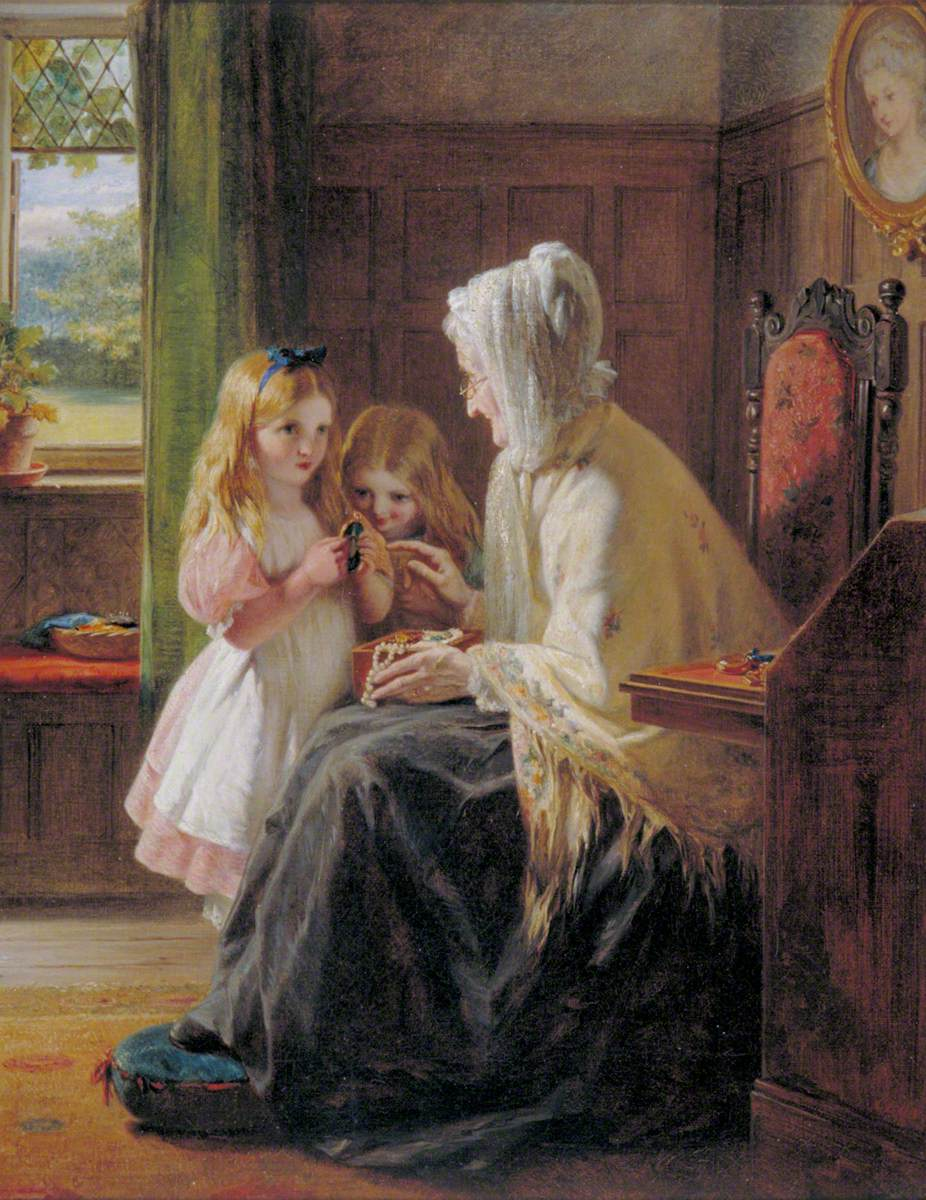
Gran's Treasures by George Bernard O'Neill

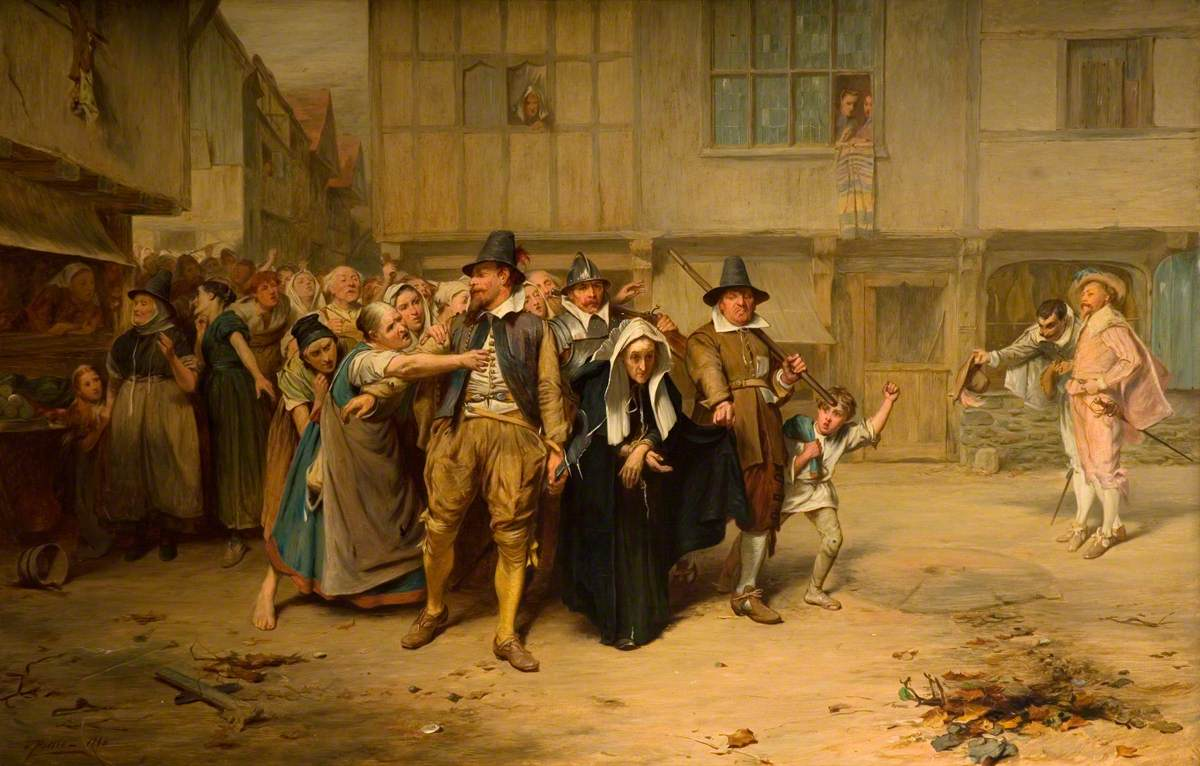
An Arrest for Witchcraft in the Olden Time by John Pettie

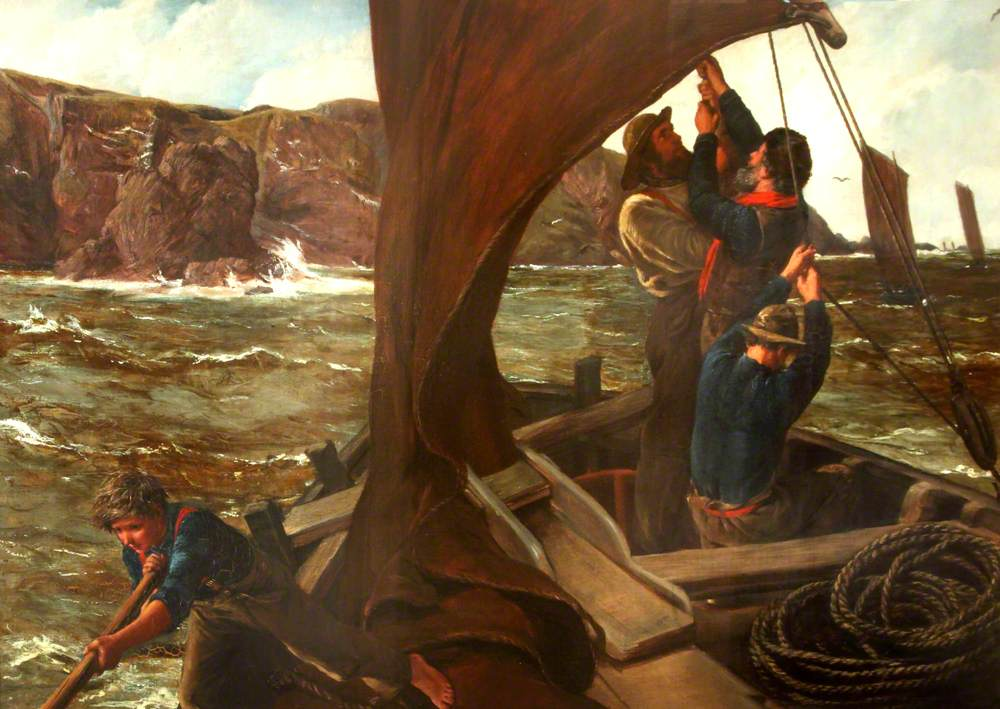
Give Us This Day Our Daily Bread by James Clarke Hook

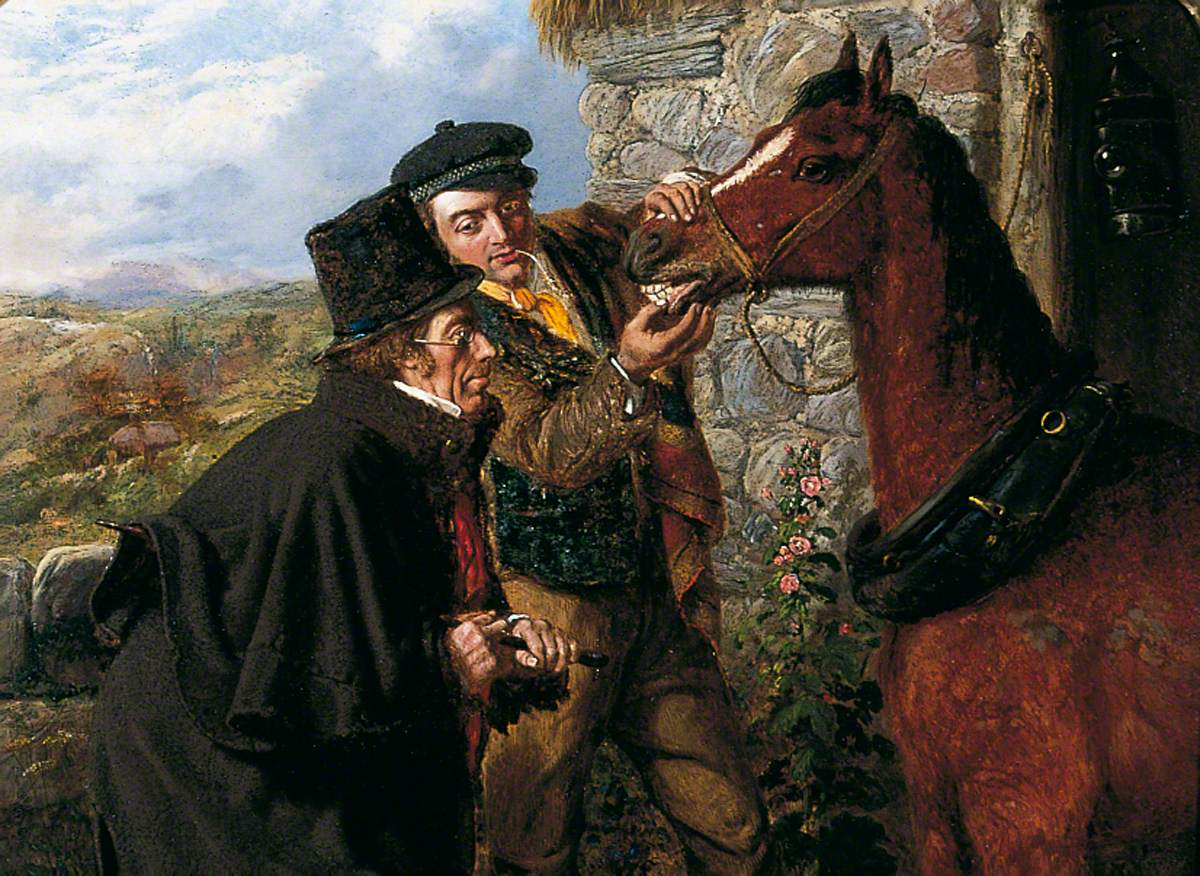
Not Sold Yet by John Templeton Lucas

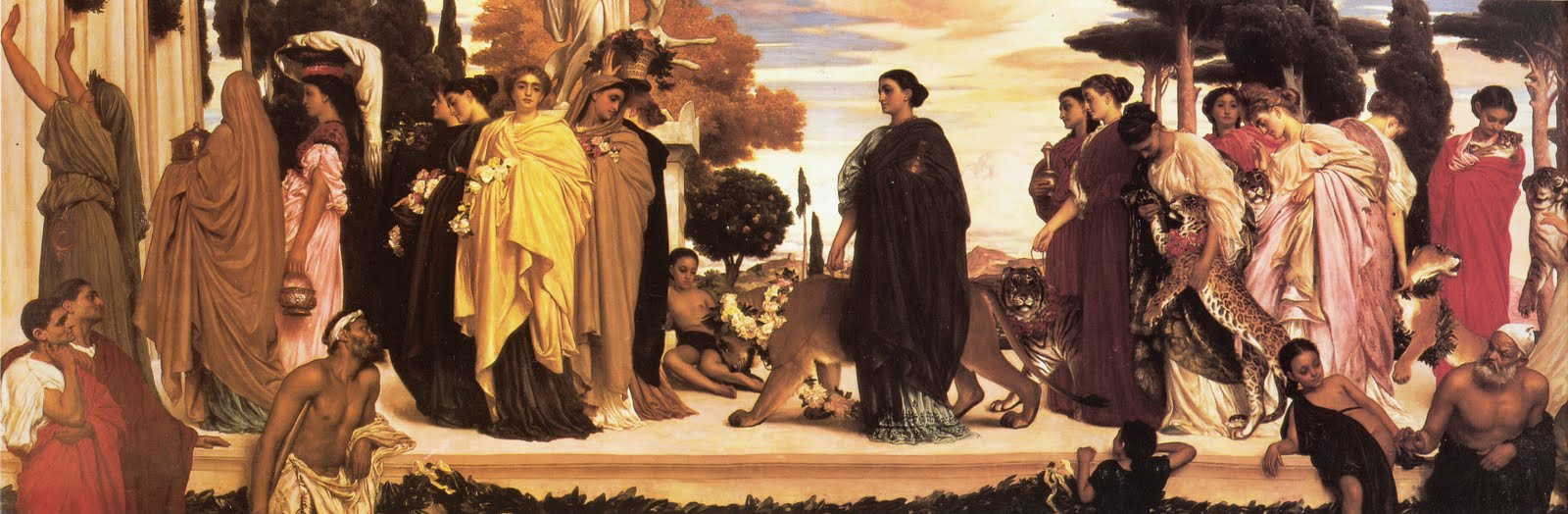
The Syracusan Bride leading Wild Animals in Procession to the Temple of Diana by Frederic Leighton

Mors Janua Vitae by Joseph Noel Paton

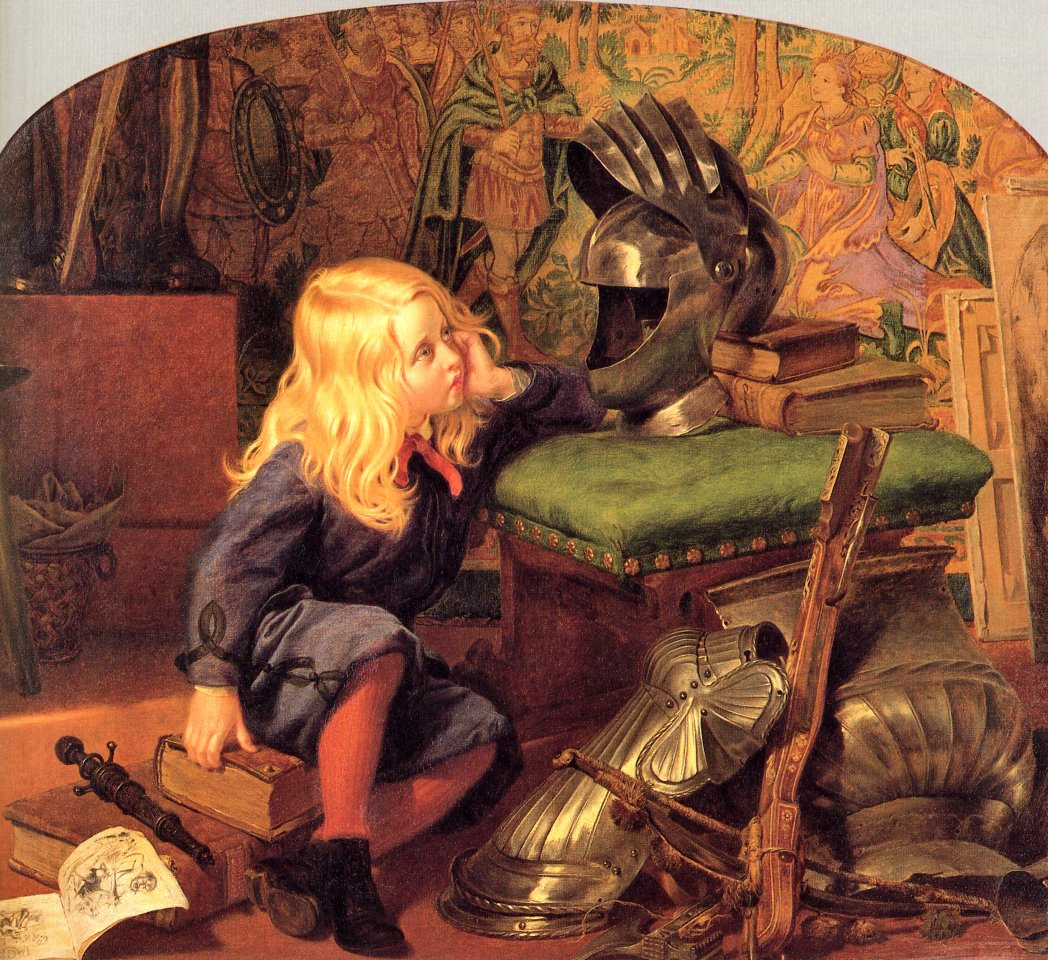
I Wonder Who Lived in There! by Joseph Noel Paton

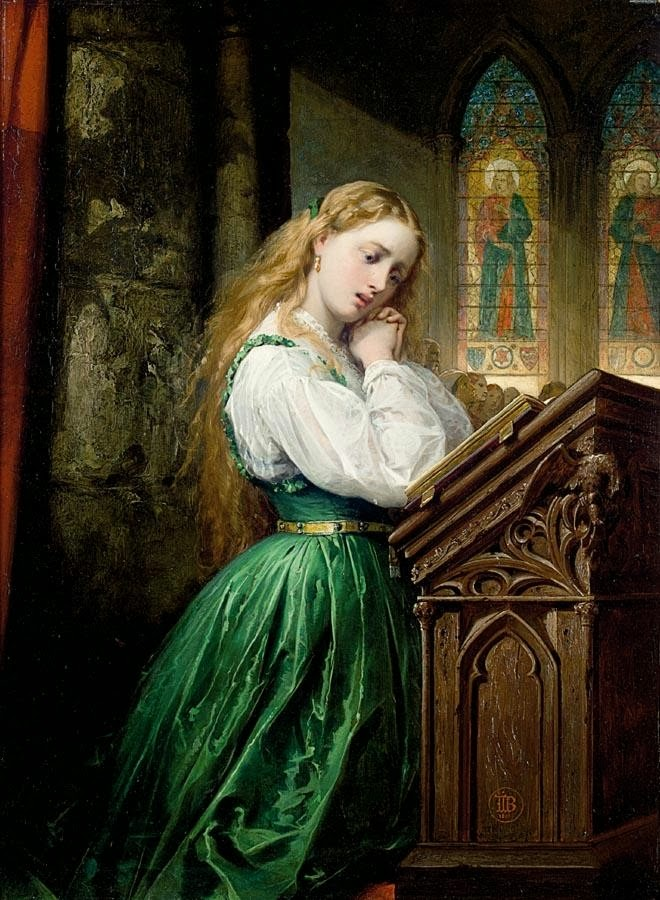
Margaret in the Cathedral by Thomas Jones Barker

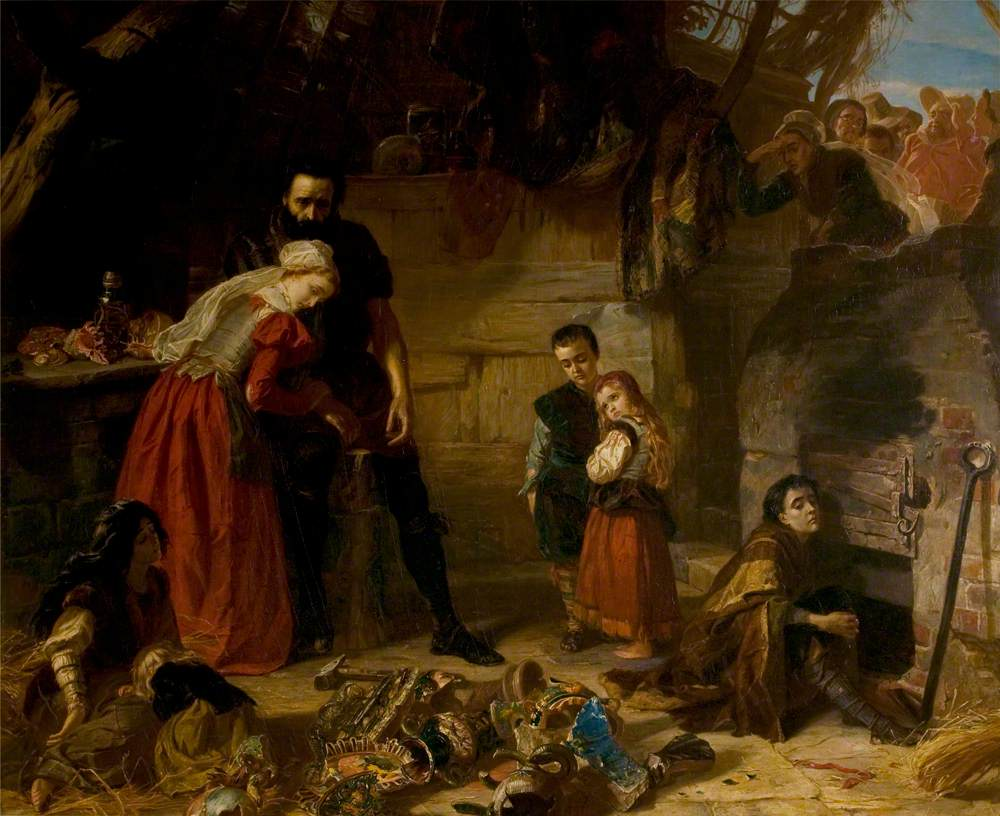
Palissy the Potter by Henrietta Ward

Reynolds' First Sketch by Eyre Crowe

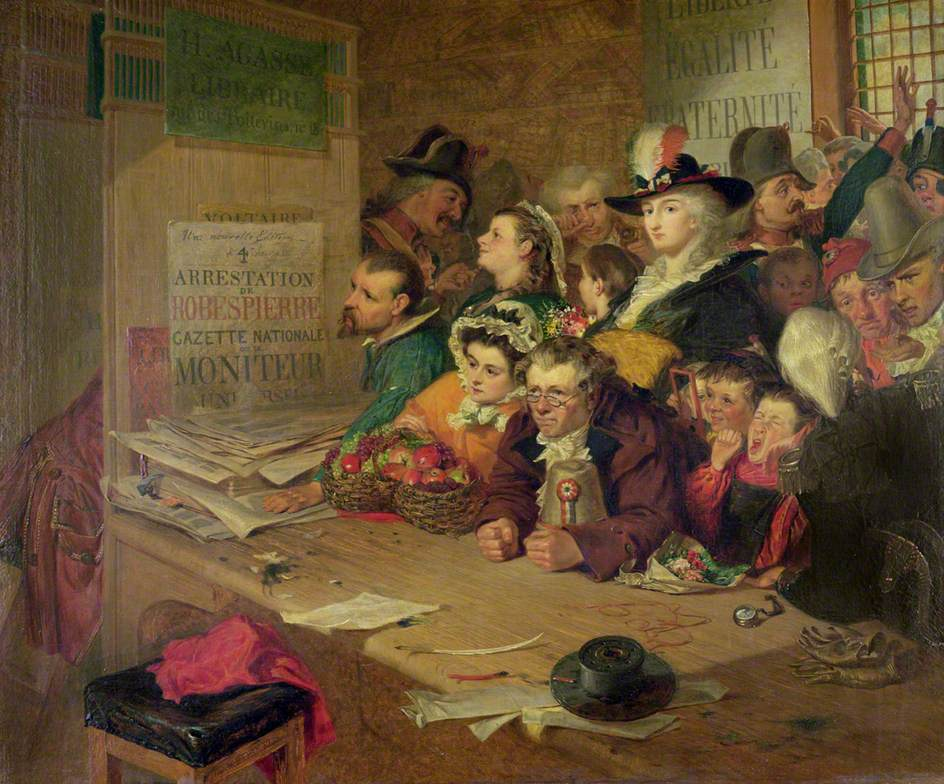
Awaiting Publication of 'Le Moniteur' for News of the Arrest of Robespierre by William Henry Fisk

The Wappenshaw by John Faed

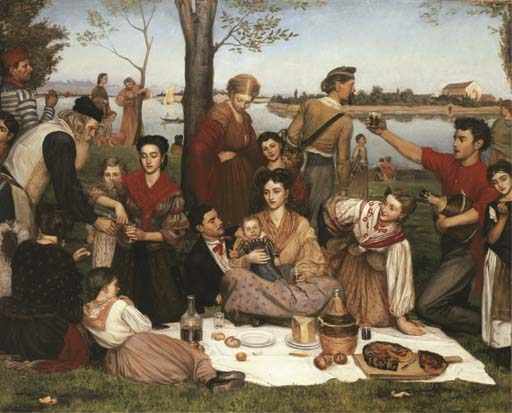
La Festa di Lido by Valentine Cameron Prinsep

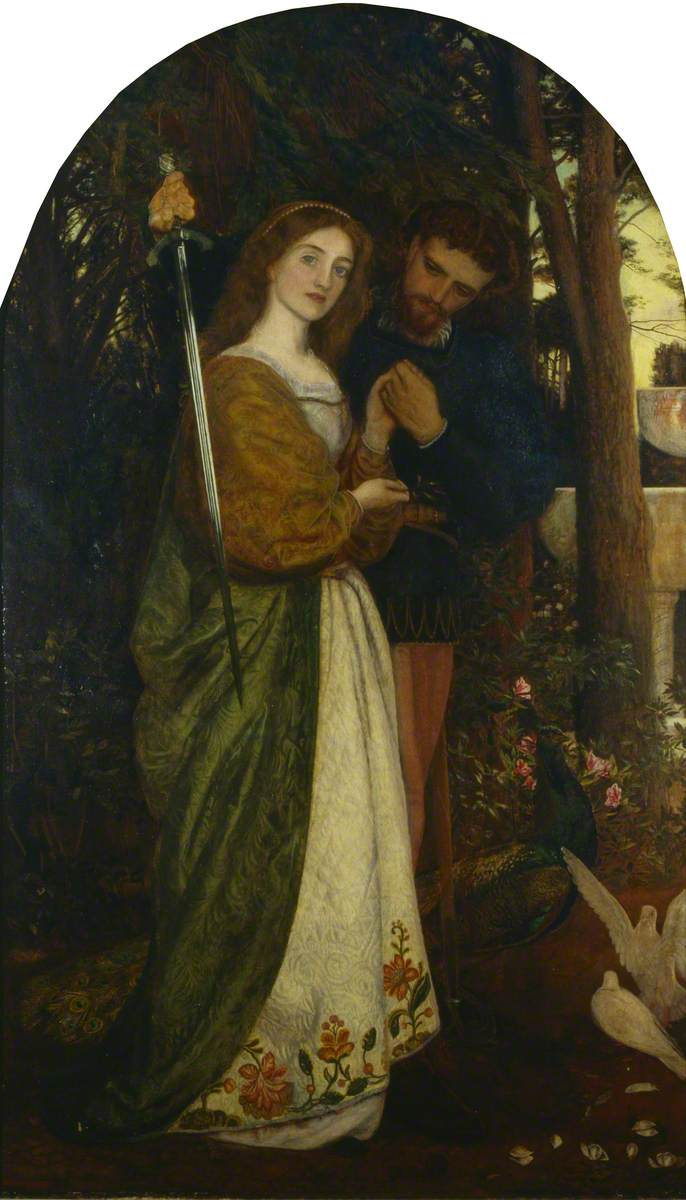
The Guarded Bower by Arthur Hughes

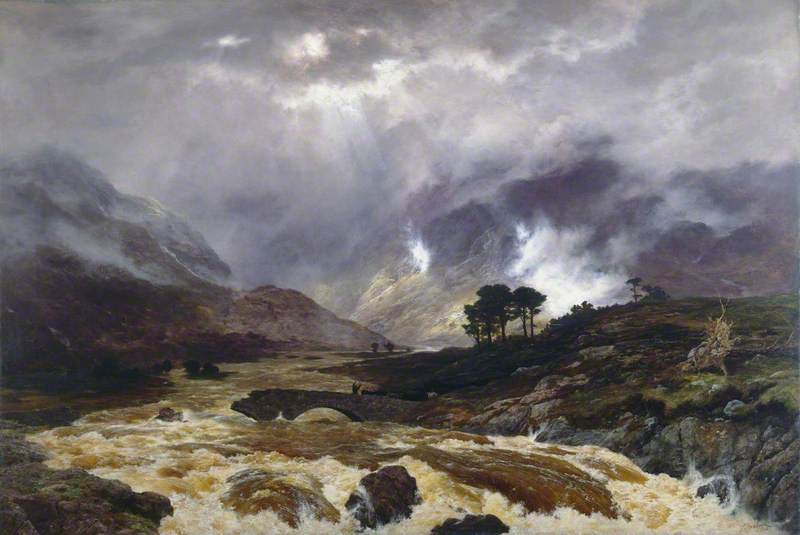
A Spate in the Highlands by Peter Graham

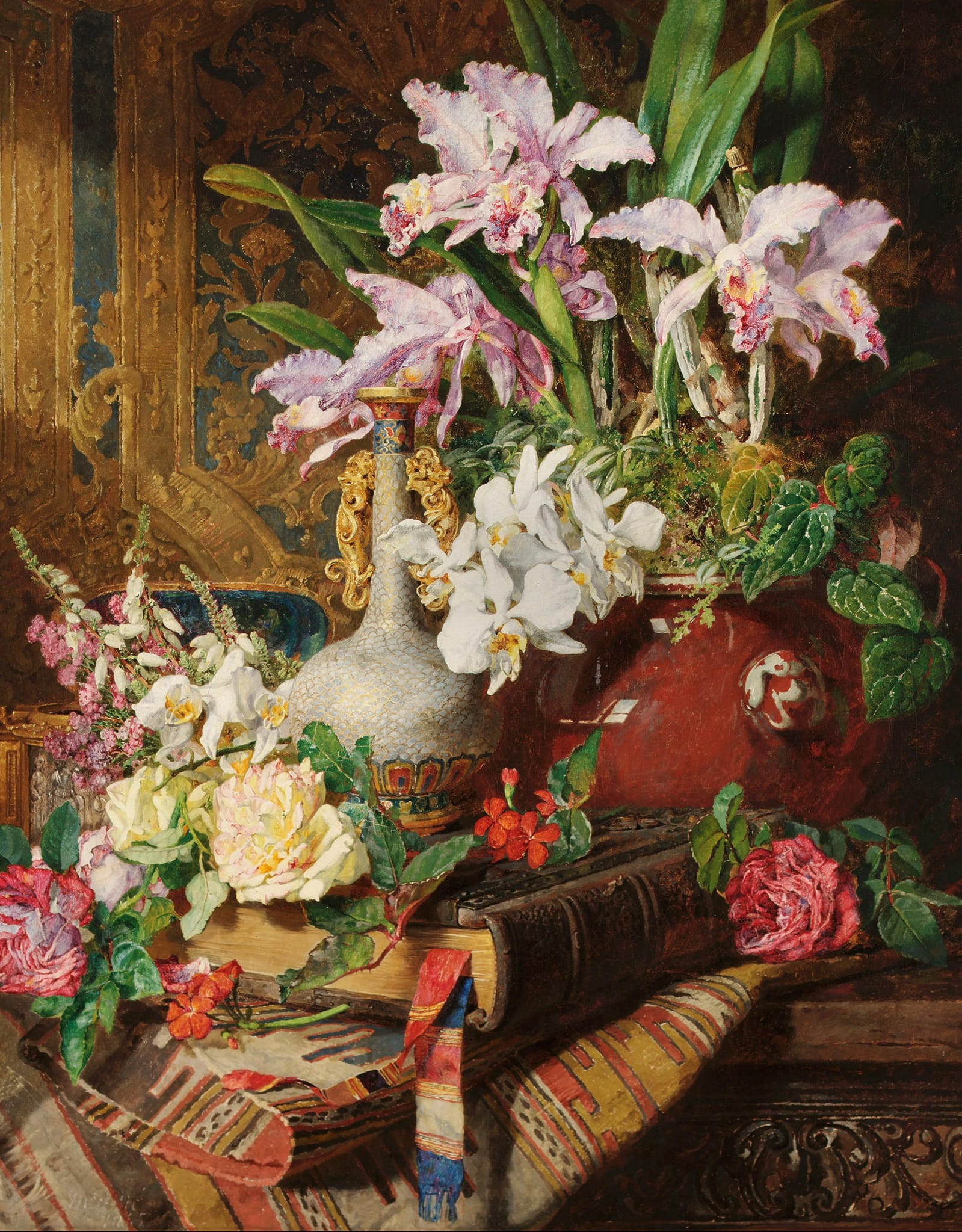
Orchids by Martha Darley Mutrie

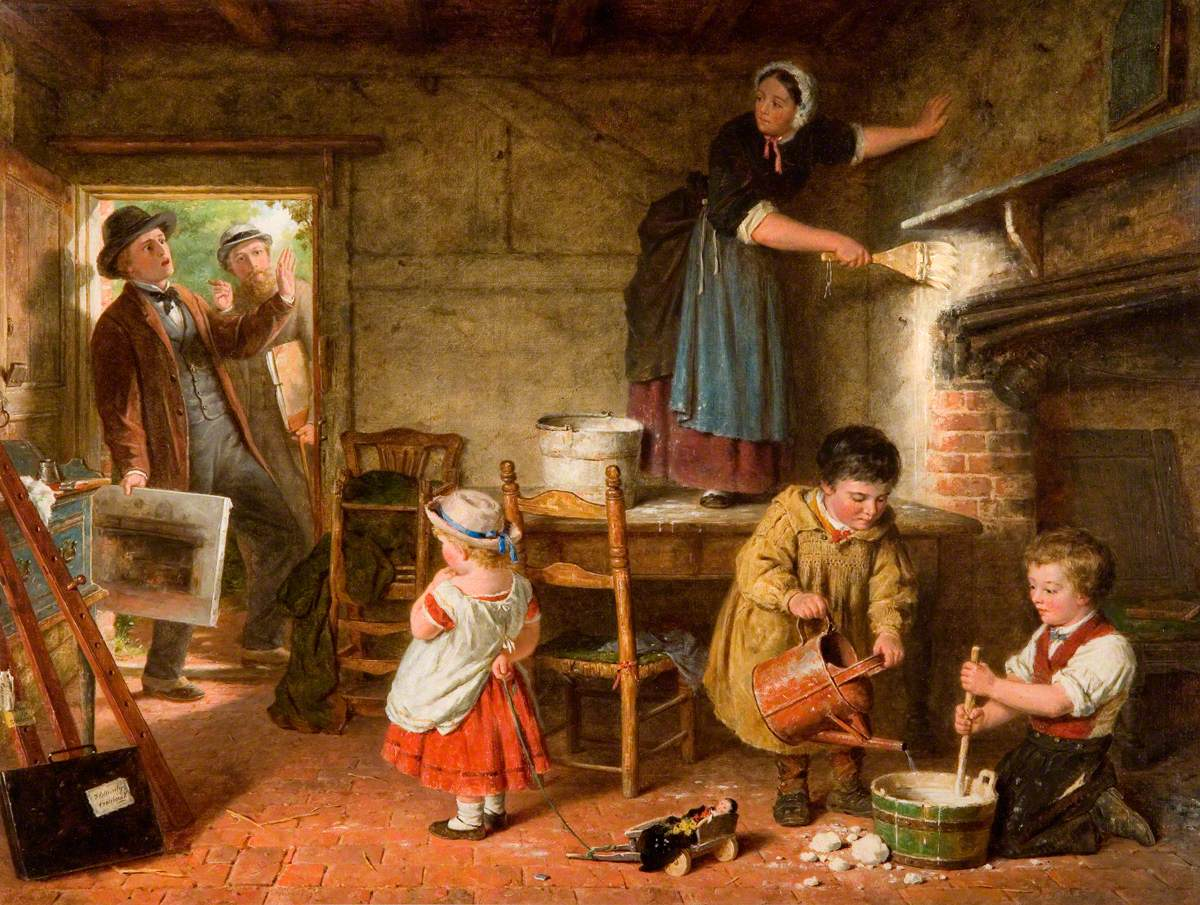
The Dismayed Artist by Frederick Daniel Hardy

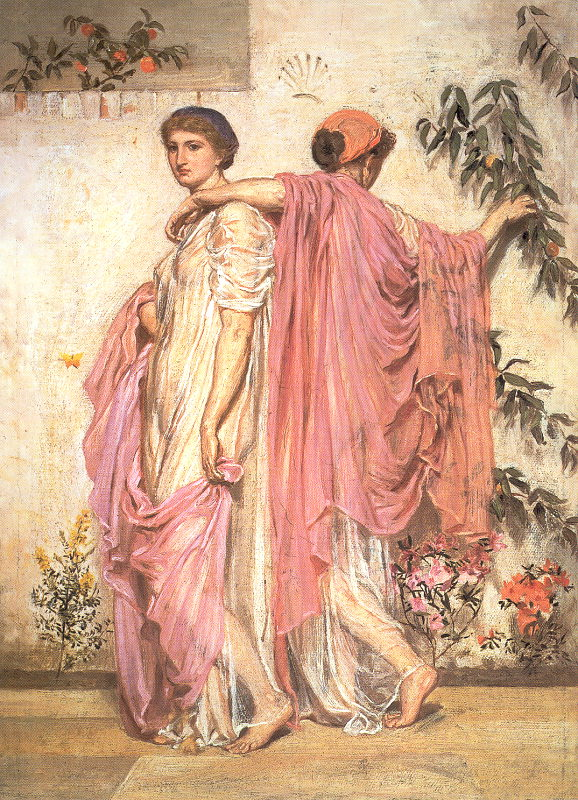
Apricots by Albert Joseph Moore

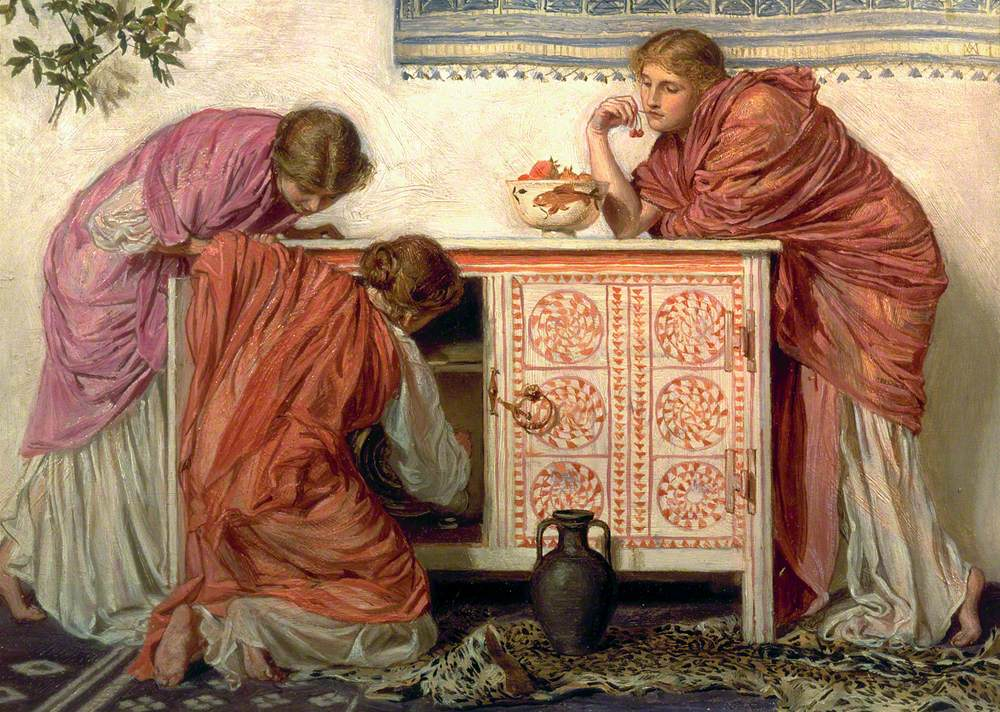
Pomegranates by Albert Joseph Moore

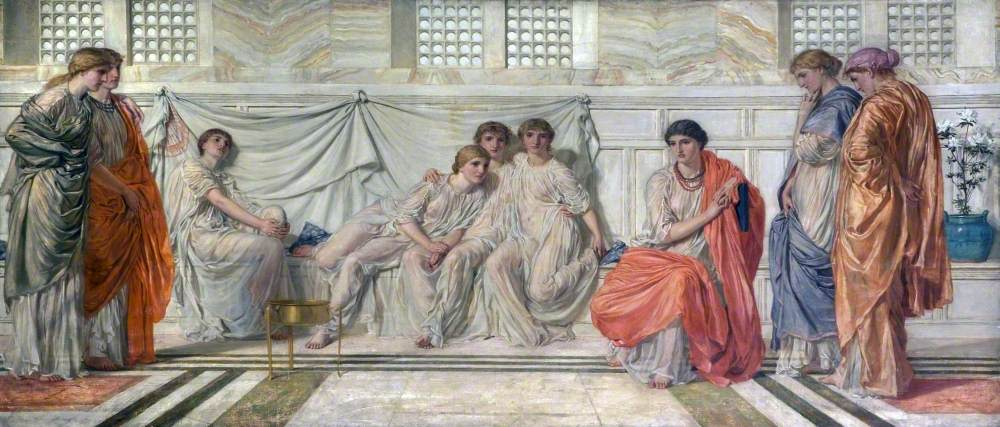
The Shulamite by Albert Joseph Moore

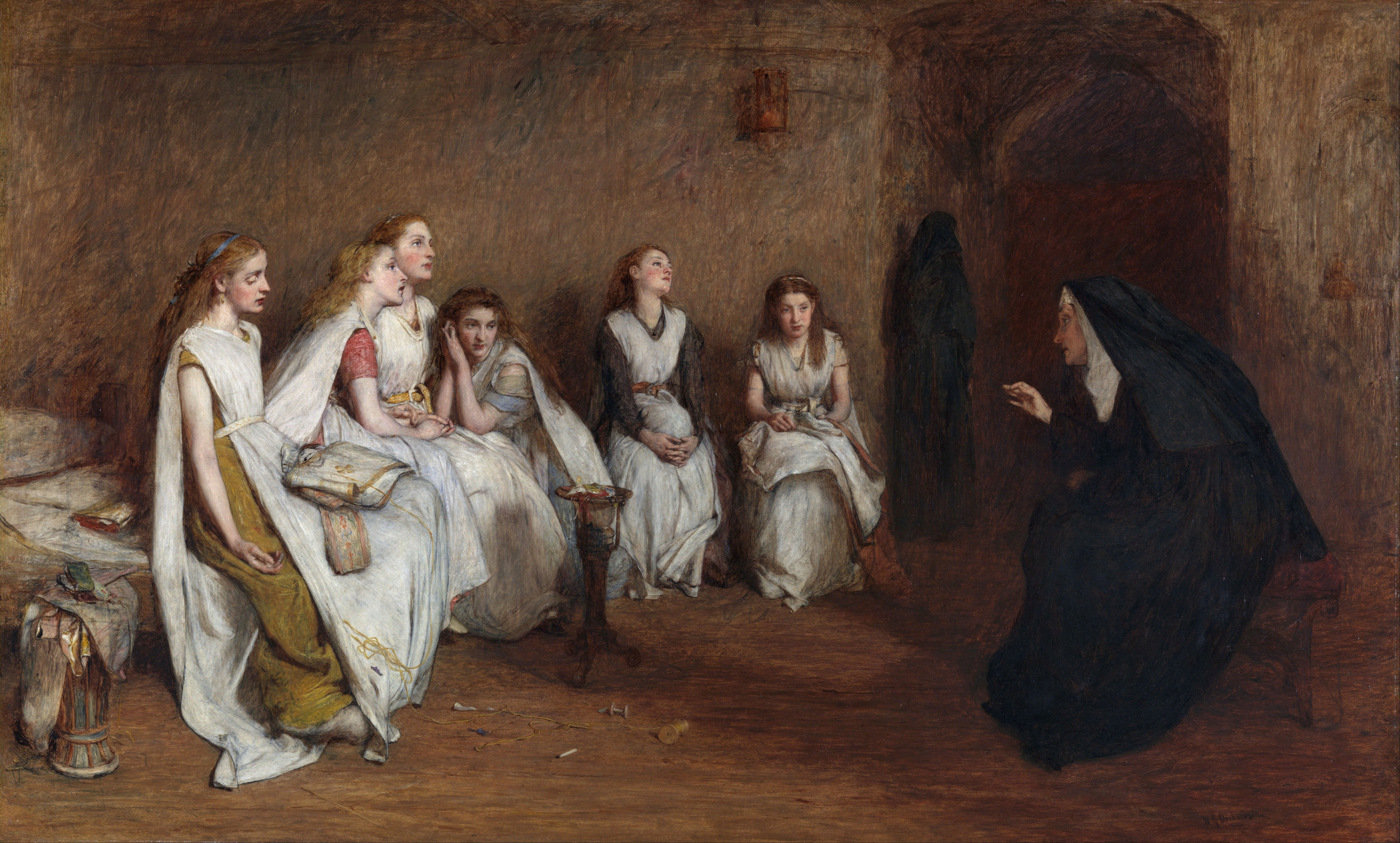
The Story of a Life by William Quiller Orchardson

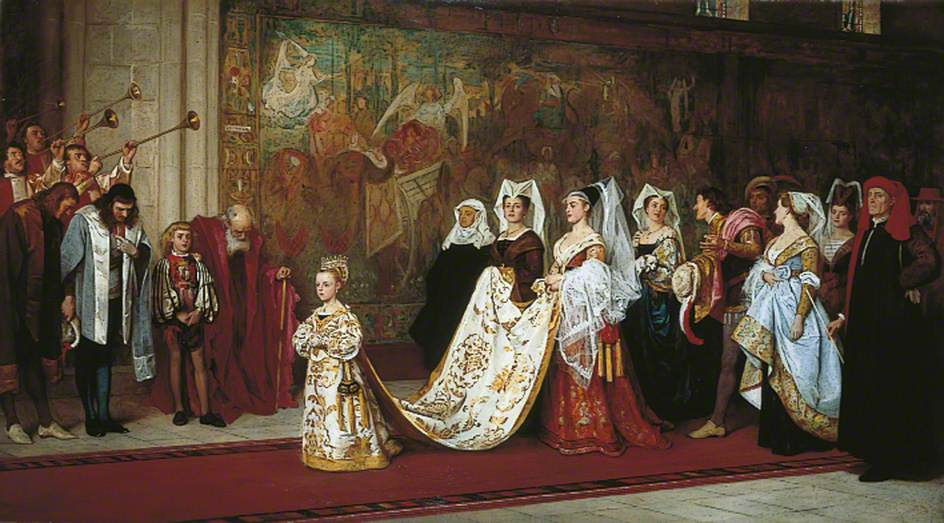
Her Most High, Noble and Puissant Grace by Philip Hermogenes Calderon

On the Ribble, Near Preston, Harvest Time by Henry Dawson

Daniel Maclise Painting The Death of Nelson in the House of Lords by John Ballantyne

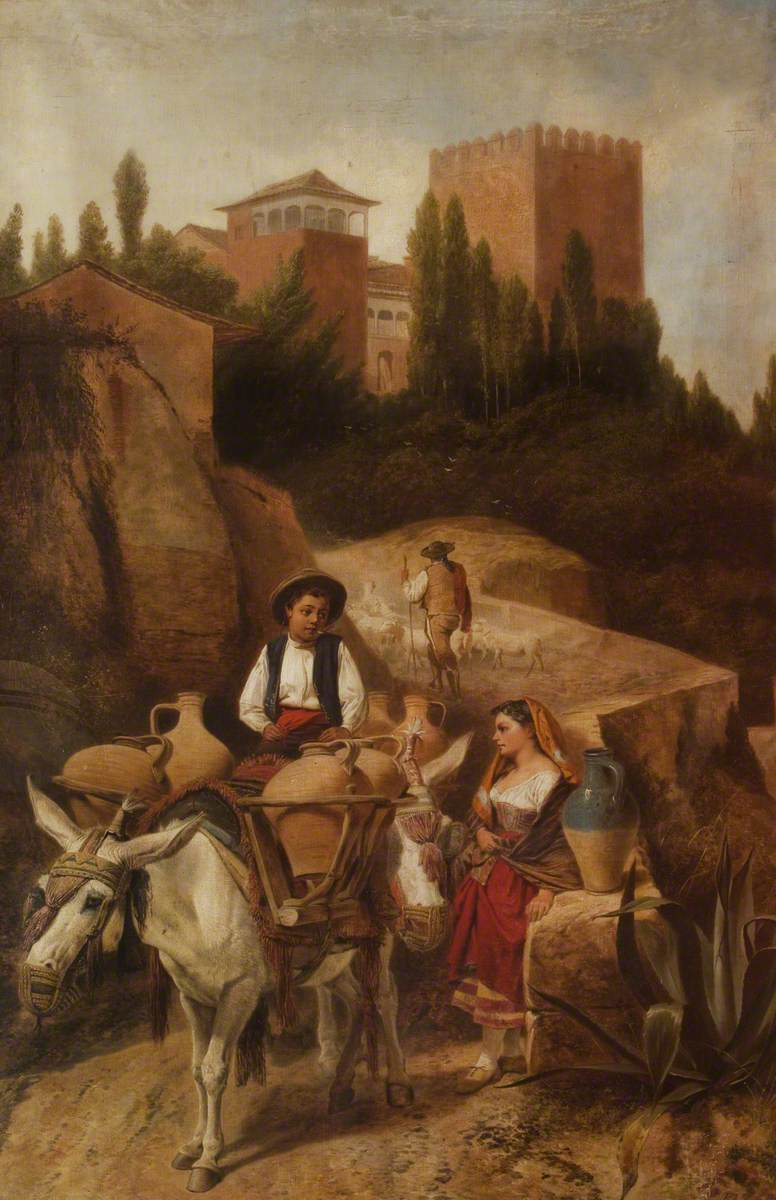
The Water Carriers by Richard Ansdell

Spanish Posada, Granada by Richard Ansdell

Anne Boleyn and Percy by David Wilkie Wynfield

Stealing the Keys by Marcus Stone

Damon and Aglae by Simeon Solomon

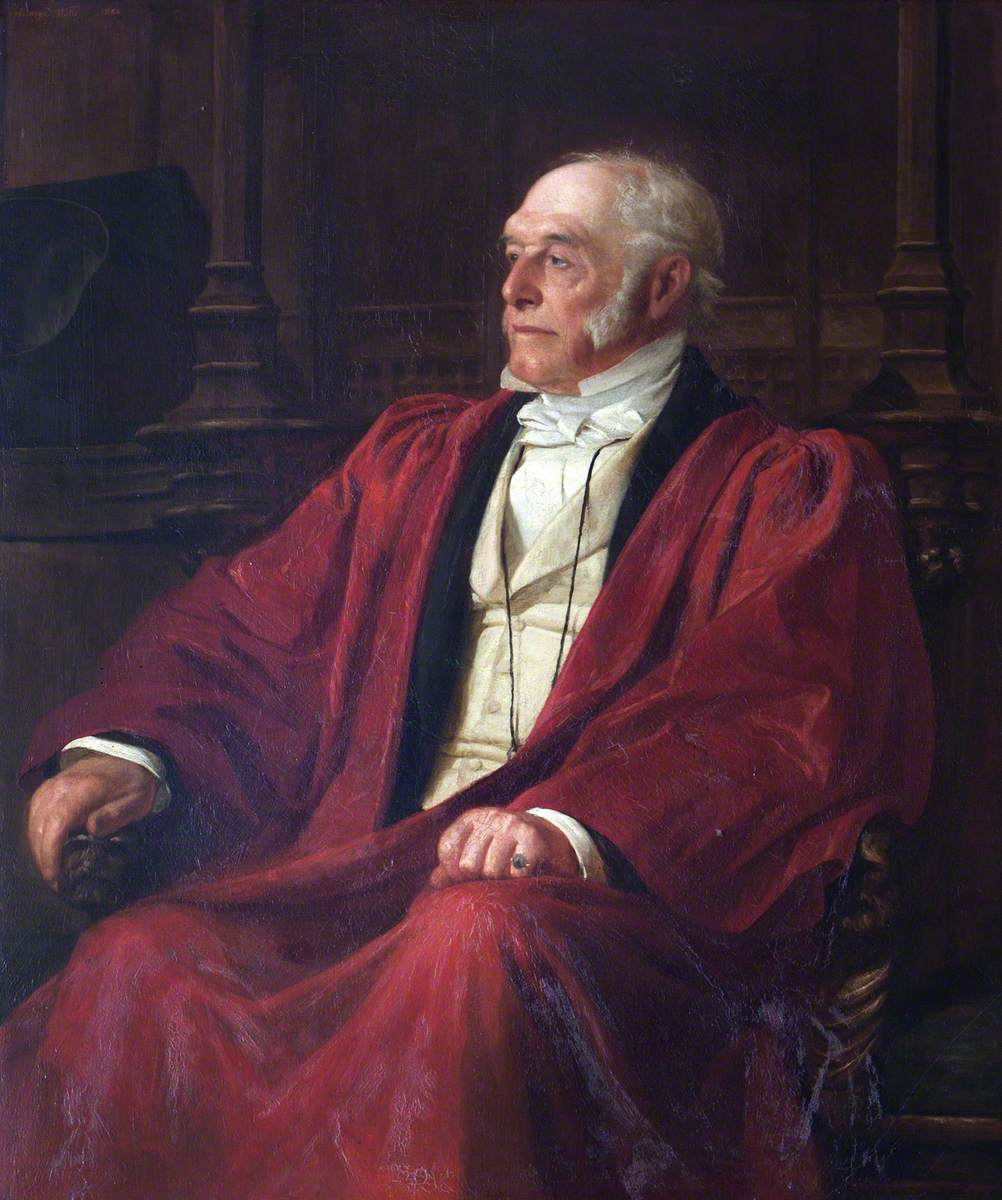
Portrait of Robert Bullock Marsham by Henry Tanworth Wells

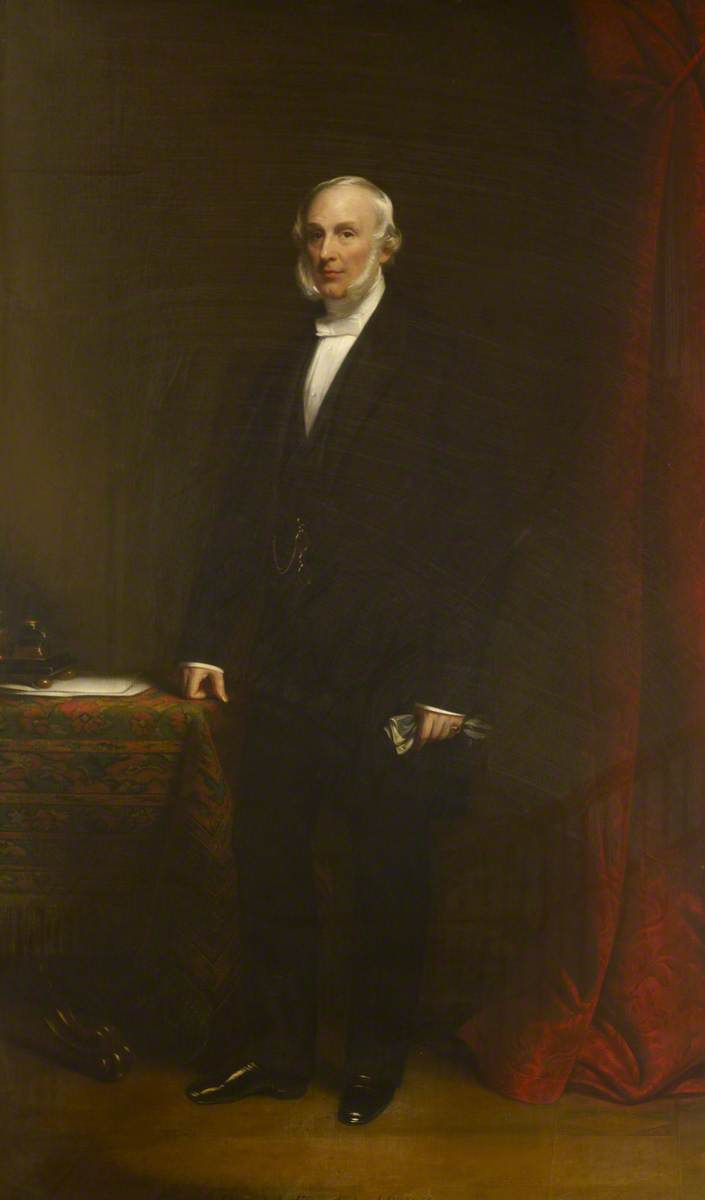
Portrait of William Marsden by Henry William Pickersgill

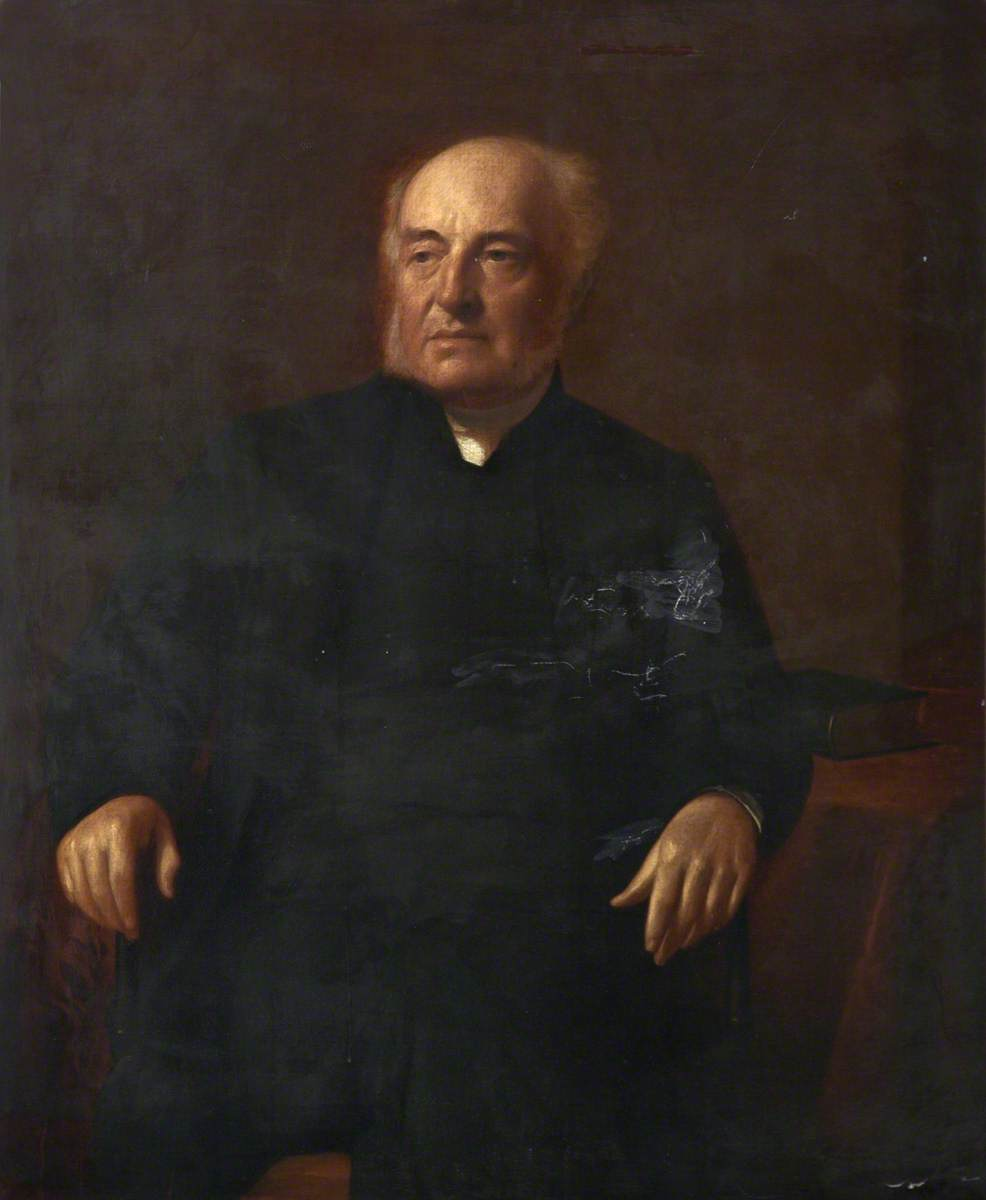
Portrait of Derwent Coleridge by Samuel Laurence

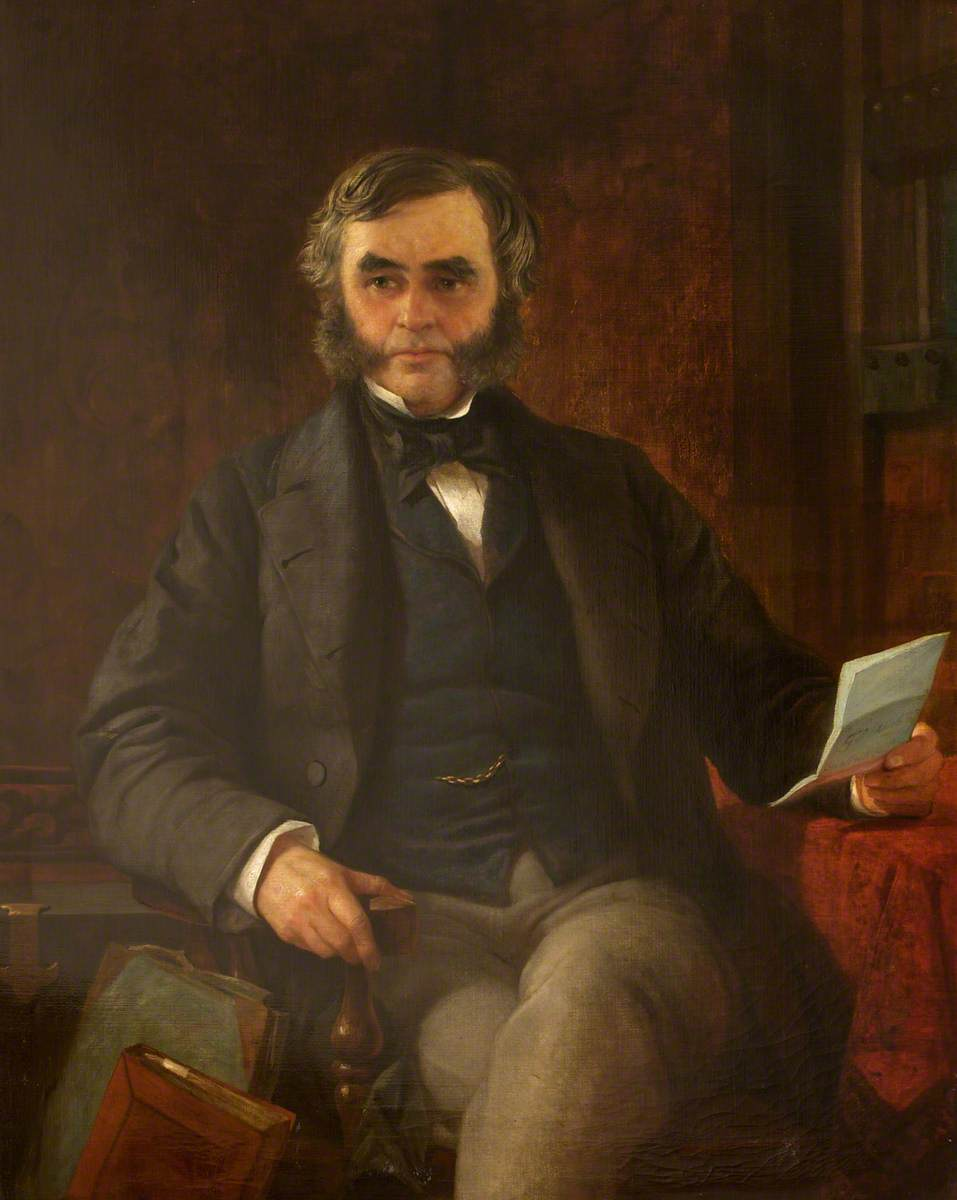
Portrait of George T. Clark by Henry Wyndham Phillips

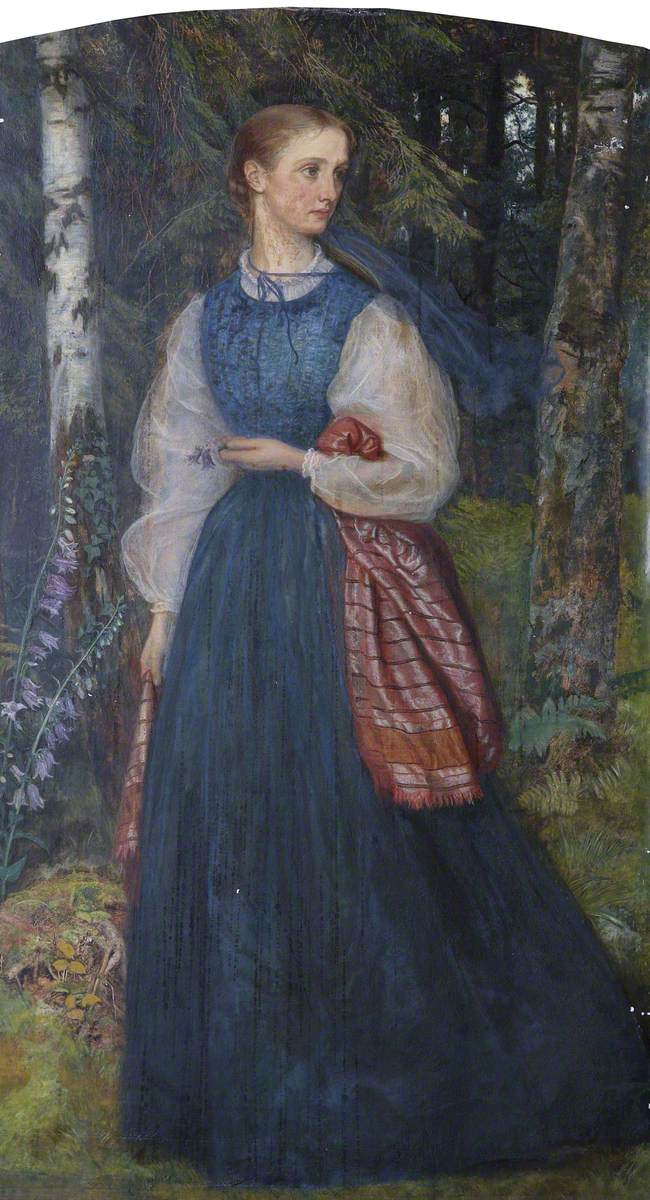
Portrait of Alice Woolner by Arthur Hughes

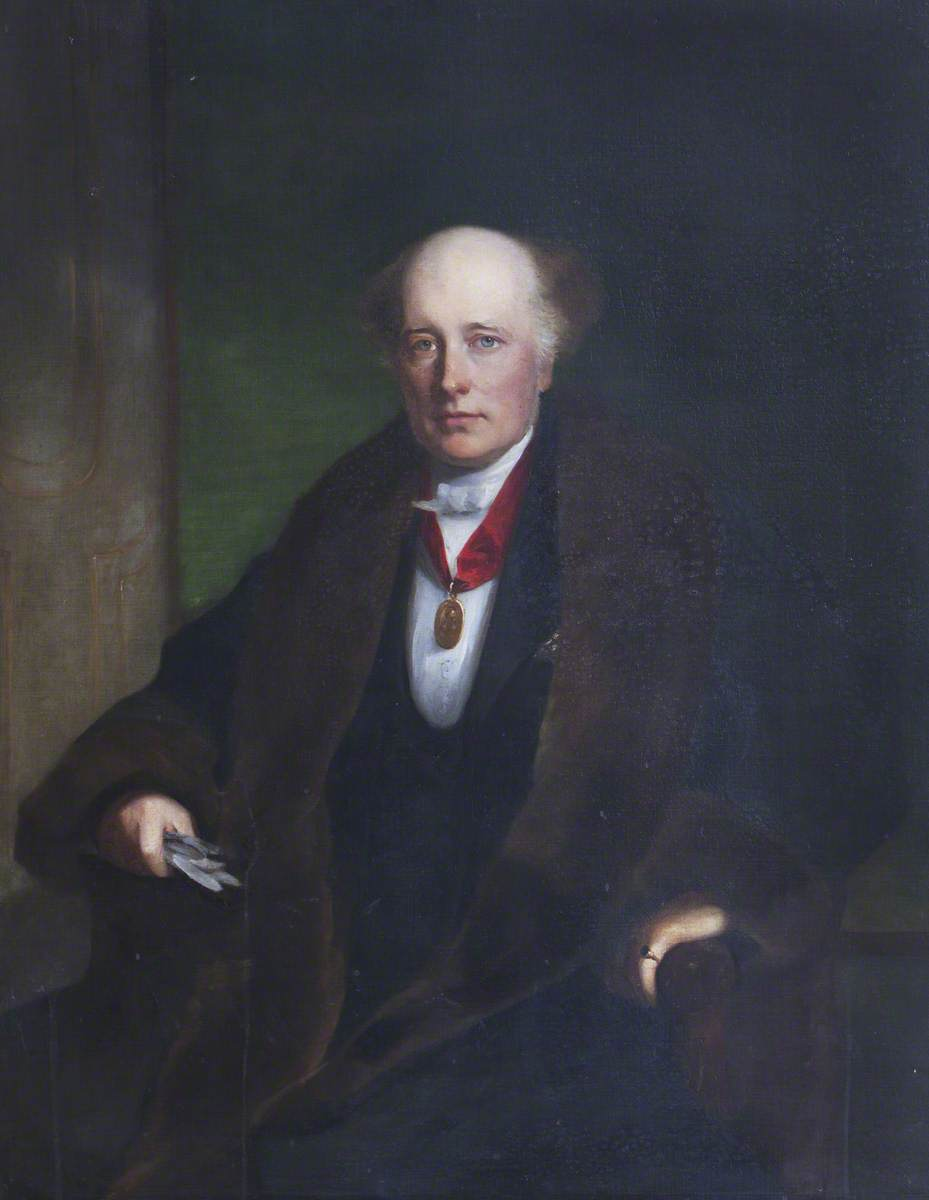
Portrait of Edmund Walker Head by Henry Weigall

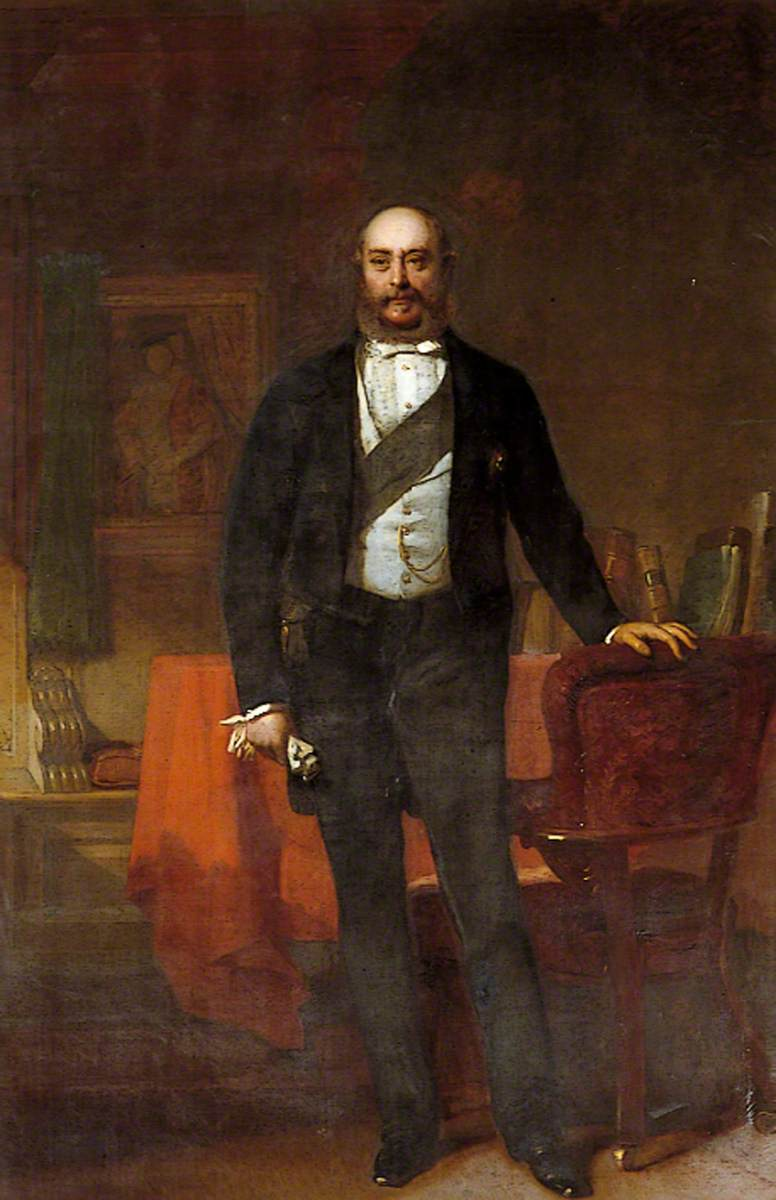
Portrait of Duke of Cambridge by John Prescott Knight

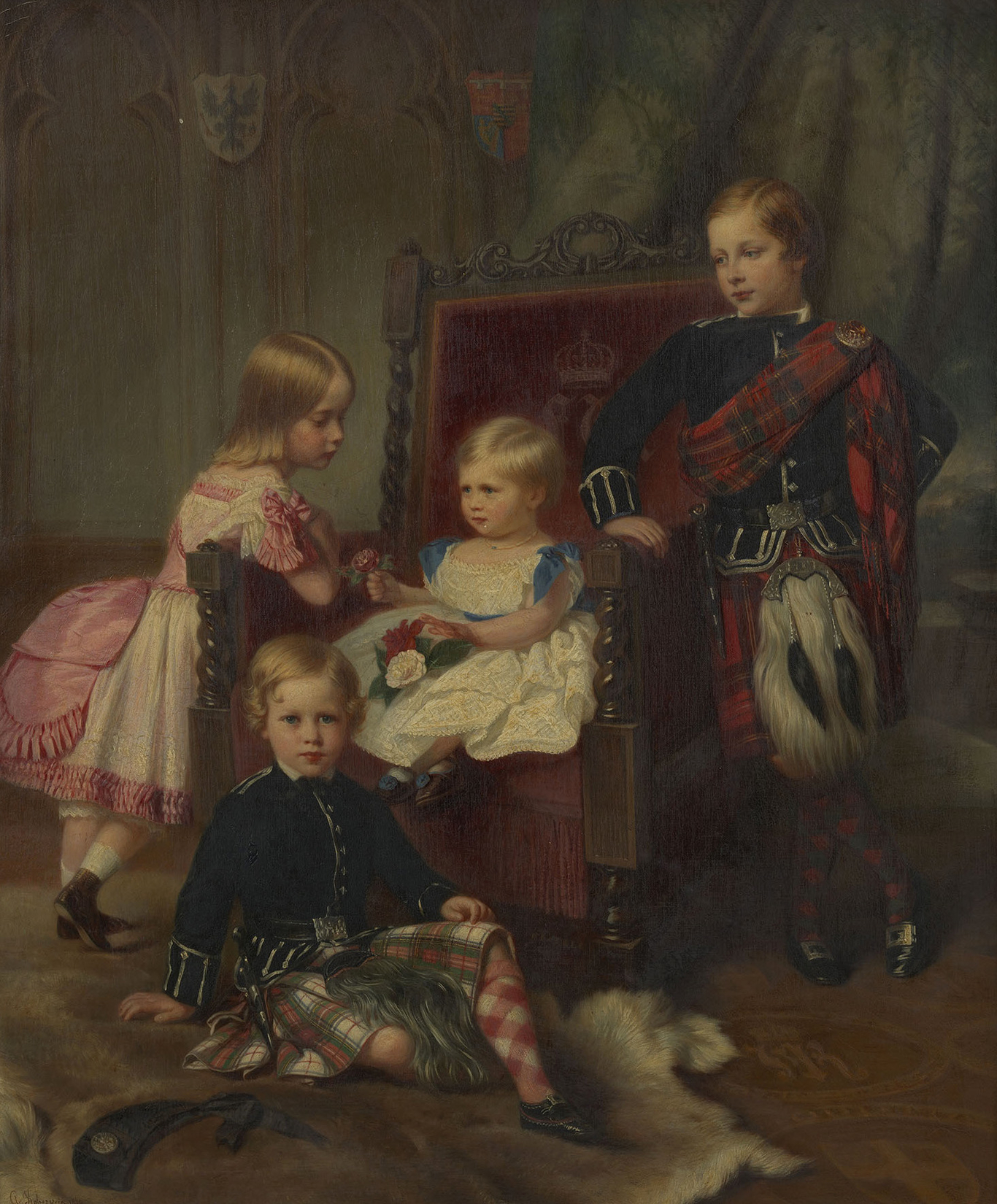
The Four Eldest Children of the Crown Prince of Prussia by George Koberwein

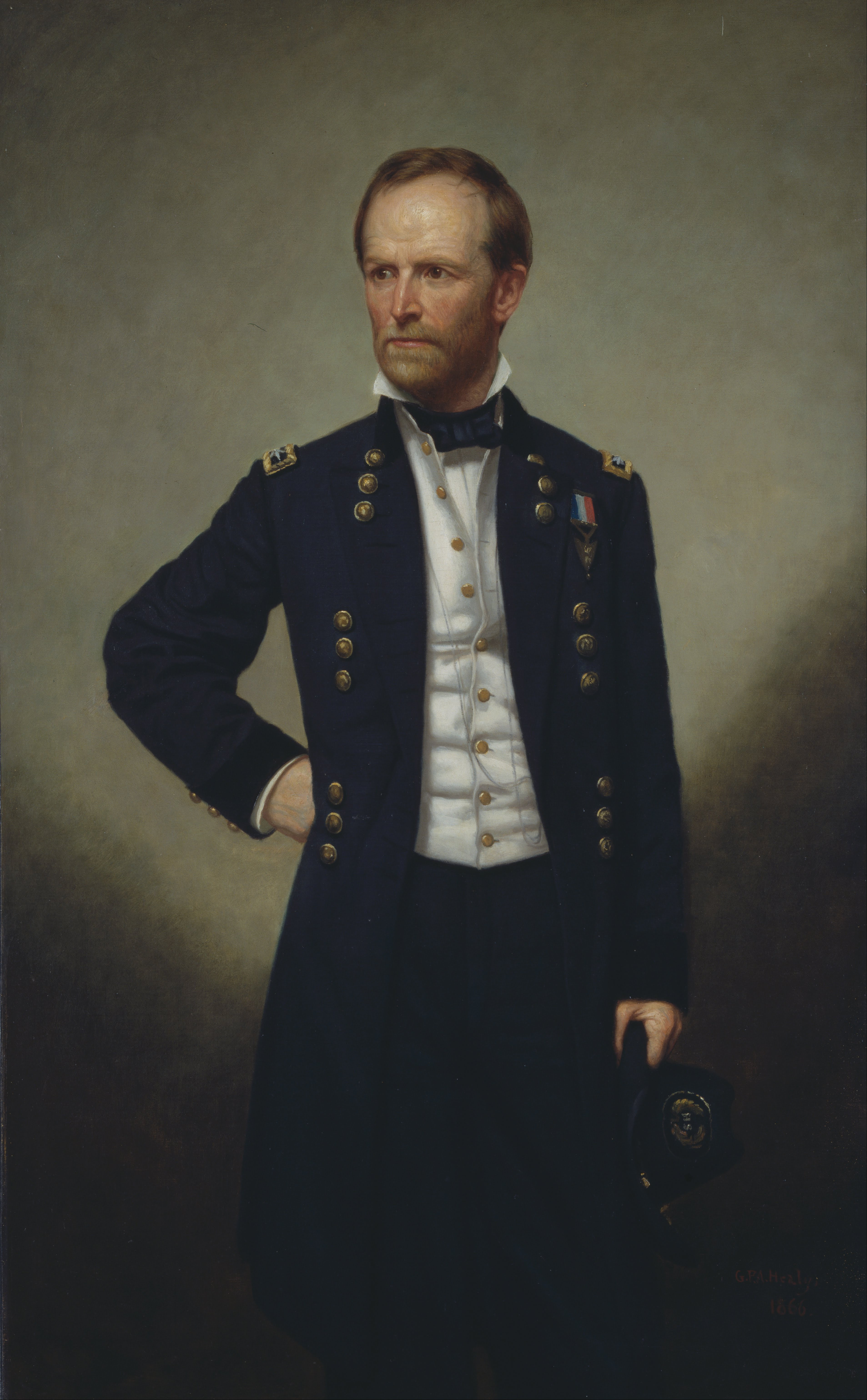
Portrait of William Tecumseh Sherman by George Peter Alexander Healy

Portrait of Anna Brassey by Francis Grant

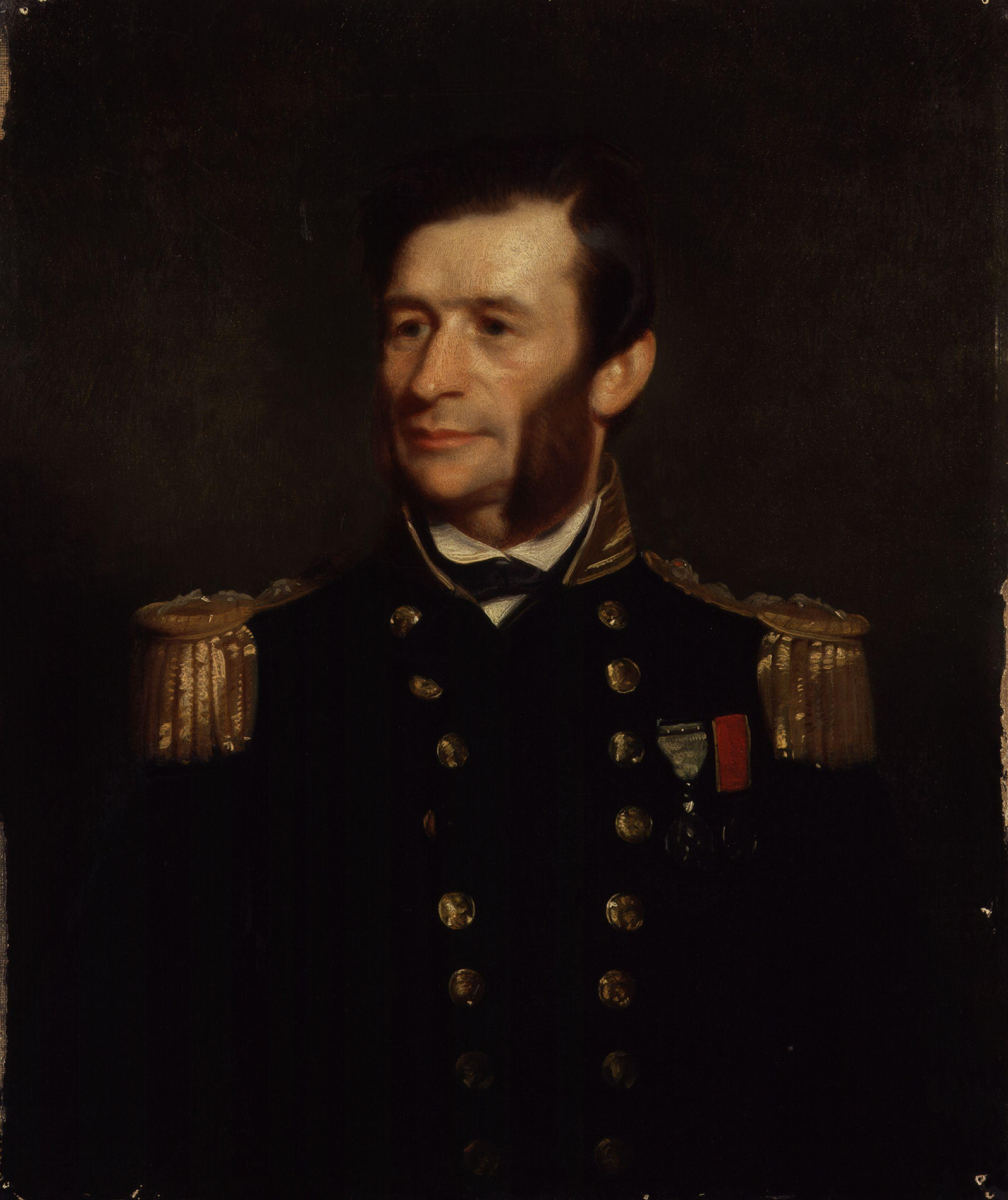
Portrait of George Richards by Stephen Pearce

== Bibliography ==
- Mingay, G.E. (ed)The Victorian Countryside: Volume 1. Routledge, 2000.
- Murray, Peter. Daniel Maclise, 1806–1870: Romancing the Past. Crawford Art Gallery, 2009..
