= 1866 in art =

Events from the year 1866 in art.

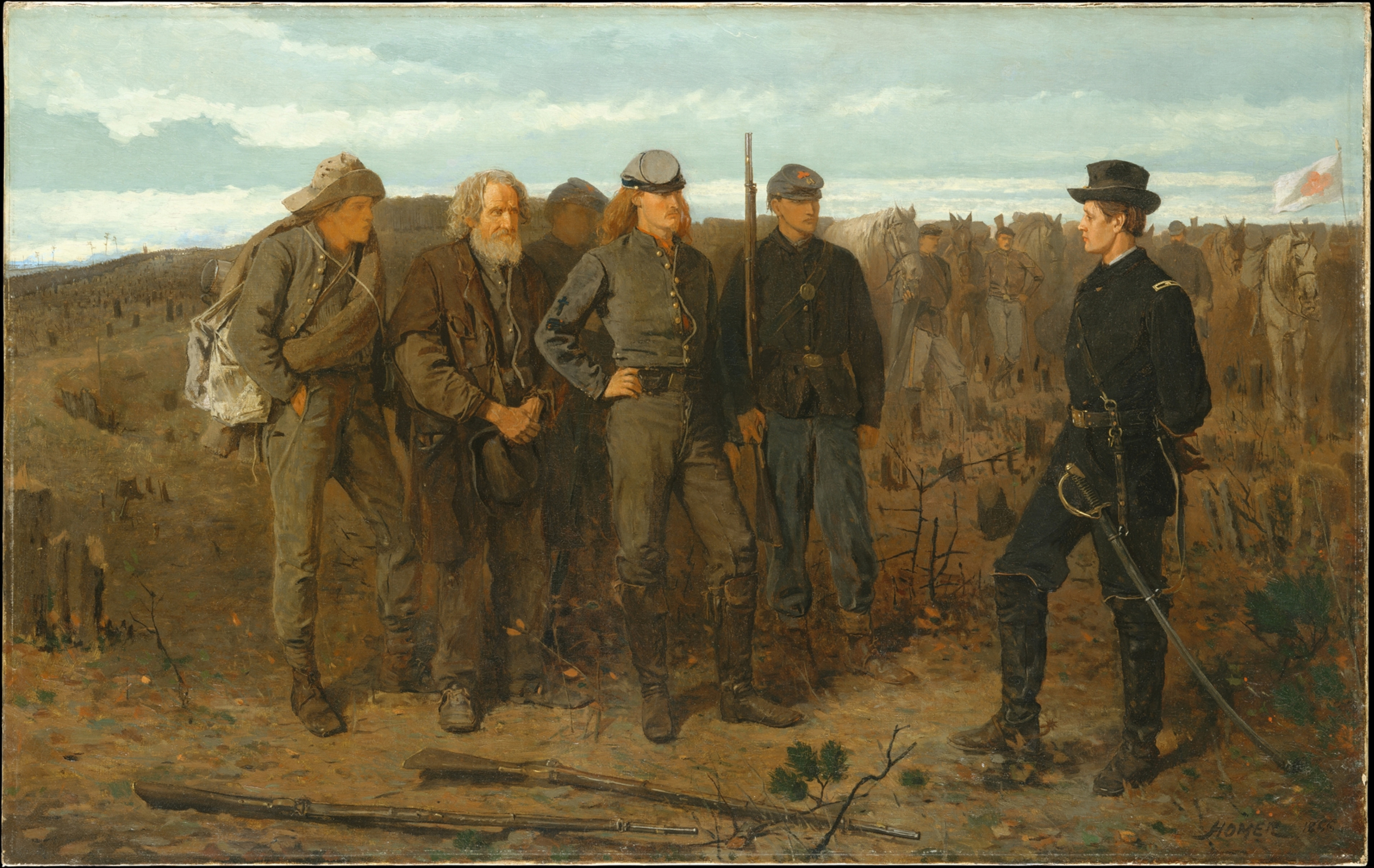
Winslow Homer, Prisoners from the Front

== Events ==
- May 7 – The Royal Academy Exhibition of 1866 opens at the National Gallery in London
- July 28 – 18-year-old Vinnie Ream is commissioned by the United States Congress to make a marble statue of Abraham Lincoln for the United States Capitol rotunda in Washington, D.C.
- Following the death of Charles Lock Eastlake, Edwin Landseer is elected as the new President of the Royal Academy. After Landseer refuses the position, the portraitist Francis Grant becomes president
- Nationalmuseum opens in new premises in Stockholm, Sweden, under this name.
- Théophile Thoré-Bürger publishes the first catalogue raisonné of Vermeer's paintings, in the Gazette des Beaux-Arts, bringing him to international prominence after nearly two centuries.

== Works ==
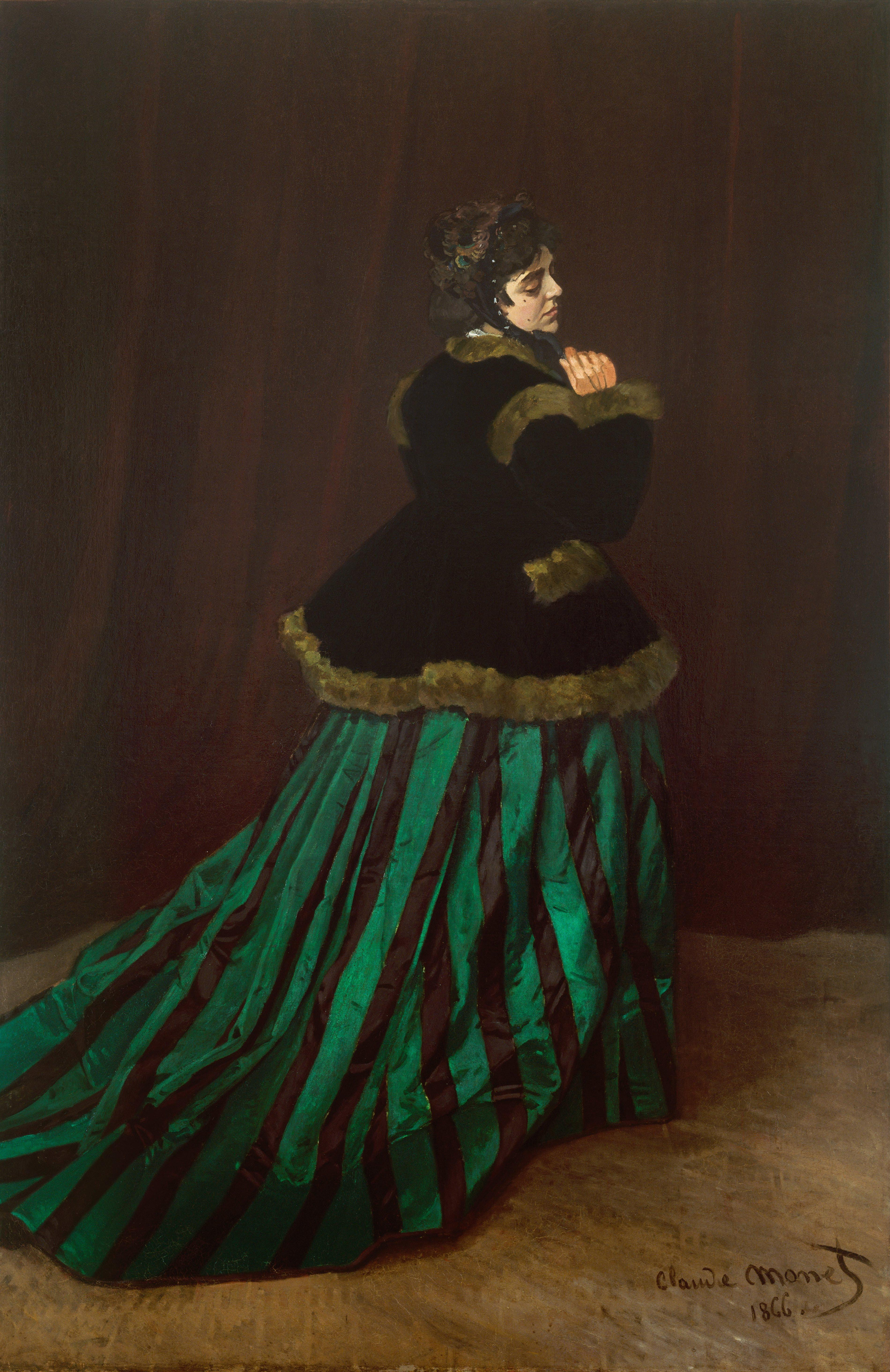
Monet's painting of his future wife Camille Doncieux

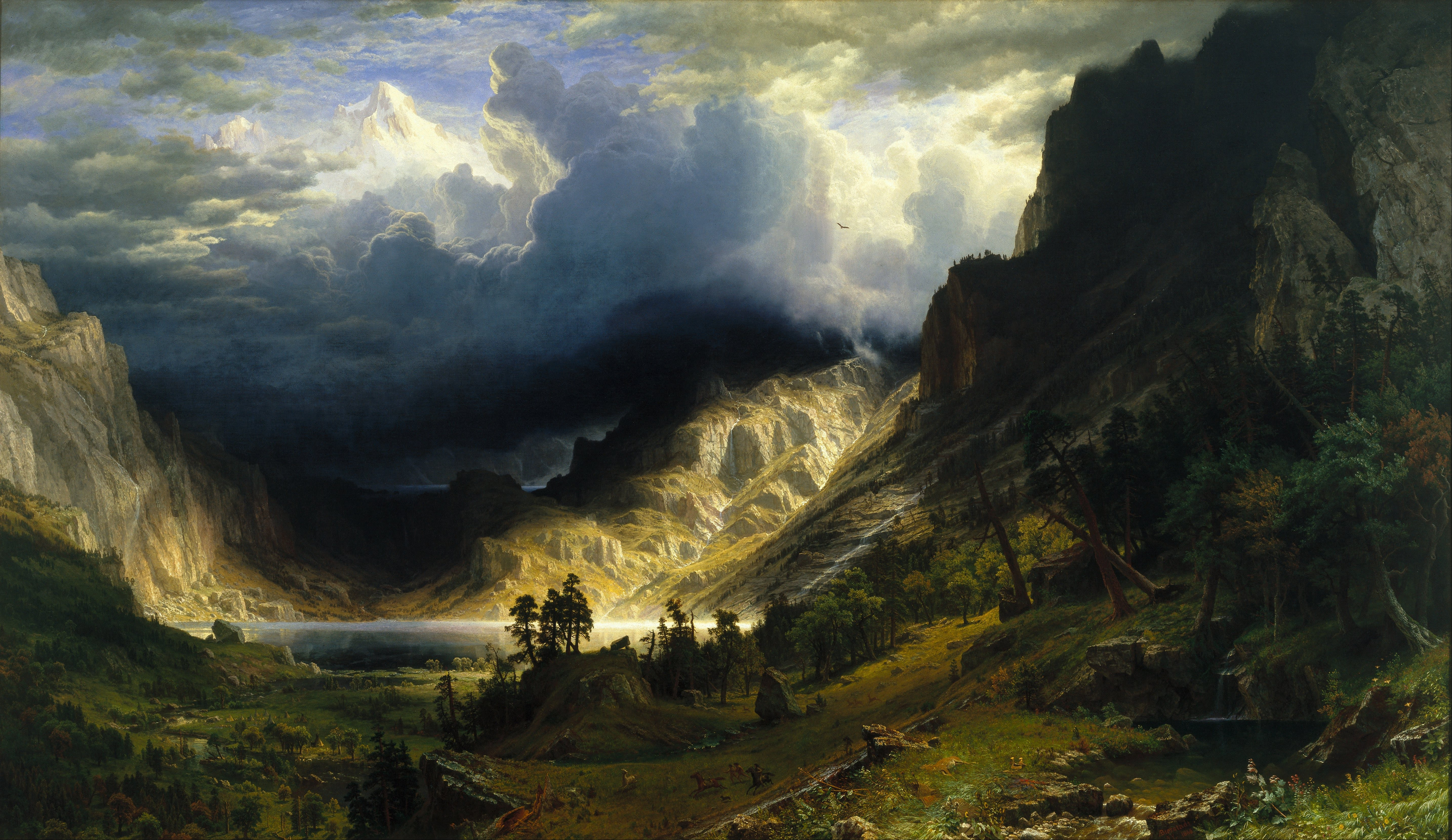
Albert Bierstadt, Storm in the Rocky Mountains, Mount Rosalie

- Albert Bierstadt – A Storm in the Rocky Mountains, Mt. Rosalie
- Carl Bloch – In a Roman Osteria
- Odoardo Borrani – At the Chorus
- William Bromley – Katherine of Aragon and the Cardinals
- Edward Burne-Jones – The Princess Sabra Led to the Dragon
- Julia Margaret Cameron – photographs
  - The Mountain Nymph Sweet Liberty
  - Series of Life Sized Heads
- Paul Cézanne – Portrait of Louis-Auguste Cézanne, Father of the Artist, reading l'Evénement (National Gallery of Art, Washington, D.C.)
- Jean-Baptiste-Camille Corot
  - Agostina (National Gallery of Art, Washington, D.C.)
  - The Church of Marissel
- Gustave Courbet
  - L'Origine du monde
  - Le Sommeil
- Edgar Degas – Scene from the Steeplechase: The Fallen Jockey (reworked in 1880-1881 and again c. 1897)
- Gustav Doré (woodcuts)
  - Illustrations for La Grande Bible de Tours
  - Illustrations for Milton's Paradise Lost
- Giovanni Fattori – La Rotonda di Palmieri
- Jean-Léon Gérôme
  - Cleopatra and Caesar
  - The Slave Market (approximate date)
- Peter Graham – A Spate in the Highlands
- Frederick Daniel Hardy – The Dismayed Artist
- Francesco Hayez – Odalisque with Book
- George Peter Alexander Healy – Portrait of William Tecumseh Sherman
- David Octavius Hill – The First General Assembly of the Free Church of Scotland, Signing the Act of Separation and Deed of Demission at Tanfield, Edinburgh 23 May 1843 (completed)
- Winslow Homer – Prisoners from the Front (Metropolitan Museum of Art, New York)
- Edwin Landseer –
  - The Arab Tent
  - Queen Victoria at Osborne
- August Malmström – Dancing Fairies
- Édouard Manet
  - The Fifer (Musée d'Orsay, Paris)
  - A King Charles Spaniel (National Gallery of Art, Washington, D.C.)
  - Still Life with Melon and Peaches (National Gallery of Art, Washington, D.C.)
  - Woman with a Parrot (Metropolitan Museum of Art, New York)
- Jan Matejko – Rejtan, or the Fall of Poland
- Claude Monet
  - Camille (The Woman in the Green Dress)
  - Le déjeuner sur l’herbe
  - Women in the Garden (begun)
- Albert Joseph Moore
  - The Last Supper and The Feeding of the Five Thousand (on chancel walls of church of St. Alban's, Rochdale; completed)
  - The Shunamite relating the Glories of King Solomon to her Maidens
- Henry Nelson O'Neil – The Last Moments of Raphael
- Pierre-Auguste Renoir – Mother Anthony's Tavern
- Dante Gabriel Rossetti – The Beloved
- Rebecca Solomon – A Wounded Dove
- Simeon Solomon – Love in Autumn
- Bertalan Székely – The Battle of Mohács
- Frederick Walker – Wayfarers
- Edward Matthew Ward – Leicester and Amy Robsart at Cumnor Hall
- John Quincy Adams Ward – Indian Hunter (bronze)
- Henry Tanworth Wells – Volunteers at a Firing Point

== Births ==
- January 17 – Joseph Bernard, French sculptor (died 1931)
- January 23 – Lydia Field Emmet, American painter and designer (died 1952)
- February 26 – Milly Childers, English painter (died 1922)
- March 17 – Alice Austen, American photographer (died 1952)
- May 11 – Clare Atwood, English painter (died 1962)
- June 13 – Aby Warburg, German art historian (died 1929)
- June 16 – Joaquín Clausell, Mexican impressionist landscape painter, lawyer and political activist (died 1935)
- July 3 – Ambroise Vollard, French art dealer (died 1939)
- July 14 – Juliette Wytsman, Belgian painter (died 1925)
- July 19 – John Duncan, Scottish painter (died 1945)
- July 28 – Beatrix Potter, English writer and illustrator (died 1943)
- August 9 – Emil Fuchs, Austrian-born sculptor and painter (died 1929)
- August 13 – Jadwiga Golcz, Polish photographer (died 1936)
- August 31 – Georg Jensen, Danish silversmith (died 1935)
- October 2 – Charles Ricketts, English designer (died 1931)

== Deaths ==
- January 15 – Massimo d'Azeglio, Italian statesman, novelist and painter (born 1798)
- January 17 – George Petrie, Irish painter, musician, antiquary and archaeologist (born 1790)
- January 27 – John Gibson, Welsh-born sculptor (born 1790)
- January 30 – Léon Bonvin, French painter an watercolorist (born 1834)
- March 23 – Ferdinand von Arnim, German architect and watercolour painter (born 1814)
- April 1 – Chester Harding, American portrait painter (born 1792)
- April 3 – Frederick William Fairholt, English engraver (born 1814)
- April 7 – Thomas Musgrave Joy, English portrait painter (born 1812)
- April 17 – Carl Georg Enslen, Austrian painter (born 1792)
- April 24 – Giuseppe Tominz, Austrian portrait painter (born 1790)
- April 26 – Hermann Goldschmidt, German-born painter and astronomer (born 1802)
- June 8 – William Bewick, English portrait painter (born 1795)
- June 14 – John Hayes, English portrait-painter (born 1786)
- August 9 – Raffaello Sernesi, Italian painter and medallist (born 1838)
- September 10 – David Hay, British interior decorator (born 1798)
- November 23 – Paul Gavarni (Sulpice Guillaume Chevalier), French caricaturist (born 1801/1804)
- December 20 – Jacobus Cornelis Gaal, Dutch painter and etcher (born 1796)
- date unknown – Jean Henri De Coene, Belgian painter of genre and historical subjects (born 1798)
