= Bromley (surname) =

Bromley is a surname. Notable people with the surname include:

- Albert Nelson Bromley (1850–1934), English architect based in Nottingham
- Allan Bromley (historian) (1947–2002), Australian historian of computing
- Allyn Bromley (born 1928), American artist and art educator
- Bruce Bromley (1893–1980), American trial lawyer
- Cuthbert Bromley, VC, (1878–1915), British army officer
- D. Allan Bromley (1926–2005), Canadian-American physicist
- Daniel W. Bromley (born 1940), American economist
- Darwin Bromley (1950–2019), American board game designer
- David Bromley (disambiguation), several people, including:
  - David Bromley (artist) (born 1960), Australian artist
  - David Allan Bromley (1926–2005), Canadian–American physicist and academic administrator
  - David G. Bromley, American sociologist
- Edwin Claude Bromley (1888–1928), Canadian flying ace
- Eliot Bromley-Martin (1866–1946), English cricketer
- Ernest Bromley, (1912–1997) American civil rights activist and tax resister
- Ernest Bromley (cricketer) (1912–1967), Australian cricketer
- Fred Bromley (1917–1988), Australian politician from Queensland
- Frederick Bromley (1854–1908), Australian trade unionist and politician from Victoria
- Gordon Bromley (1916–2006), New Zealand long-distance runner
- Granville Bromley-Martin (1875–1941), English cricketer
- Hannah Bromley (born 1986), New Zealand footballer
- H. Thomas Bromley (1853–1924), English artist
- Hugh Bromley-Davenport (1870–1954), English cricketer
- John Bromley (disambiguation), several people
- Kristan Bromley (born 1972), English skeleton racer
- Marion Bromley, (1912–1996), American civil rights activist and tax resister
- Massey Bromley, 19th century British locomotive engineer
- Nelly Bromley (1850–1939), English actor and singer
- Nick Bromley (born 1983), Australian middle-distance runner
- Paulie Bromley (born 1974), Australian bass player, The Beautiful Girls
- Peter Bromley (1929–2003), English horse-racing commentator
- Philip Bromley (1930–2007), English cricketer
- Thomas Bromley (disambiguation), several people
- Yulian Bromley (1921–1990), Soviet anthropologist

== See also ==
- Chester "Bromley" Hoke (1847–1913), African American soldier
