= Valentine Walter Bromley =

British painter

- Born: 14 February 1848; London
- Died: 30 April 1877 (aged 29); Harpenden, Hertfordshire
- Known for: Painting, drawing

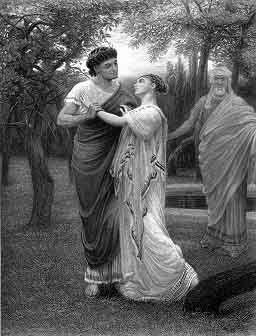
Troilus and Cressida in Pandarus' orchard

Valentine Walter Bromley (14 February 1848 – 30 April 1877) was a British artist. He was born into a well-known family of artists: his father William Bromley was a painter, his grandfather John Charles Bromley was an engraver, and his great-grandfather William Bromley was also an engraver.

Valentine Bromley received his art education from his father, William Bromley (III), a member of the Institute of British Artists. At the age of nineteen, he became an Associate of the Institute of Painters in Water-Colours.

A frequent art correspondent for the Illustrated London News, Bromley also worked as a book-illustrator; among other works, he illustrated Lord Dunraven's Great Divide.

Bromley died unexpectedly at the age of twenty-nine at Fallows Green, Harpenden, after undertaking an important series of illustrations of the Bible and the works of Shakespeare.

His brothers John Mallard Bromley and William John Bromley were also painters.

== Notable artwork ==
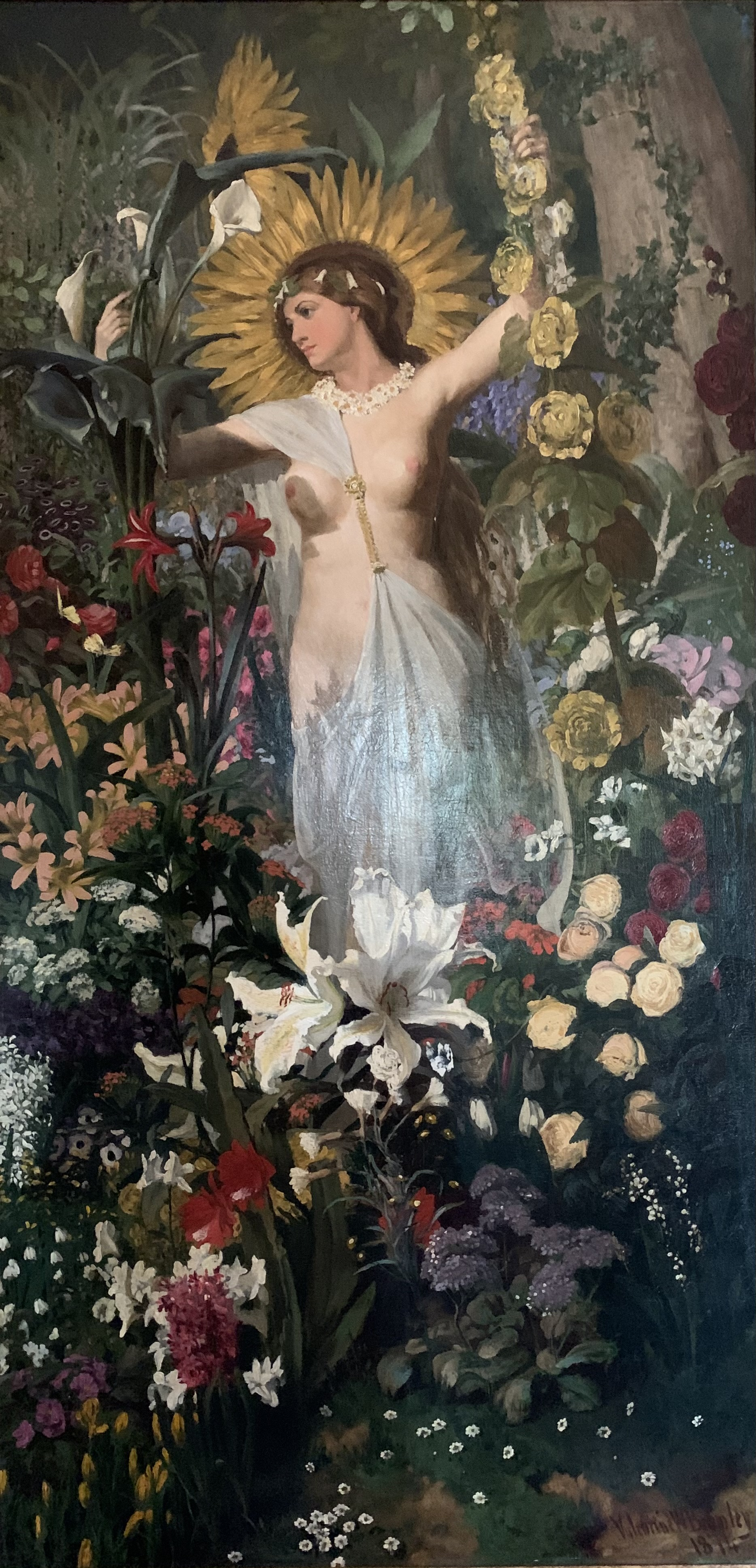
Flora, 1874
