= A Visit from the Old Mistress =

Painting by Winslow Homer

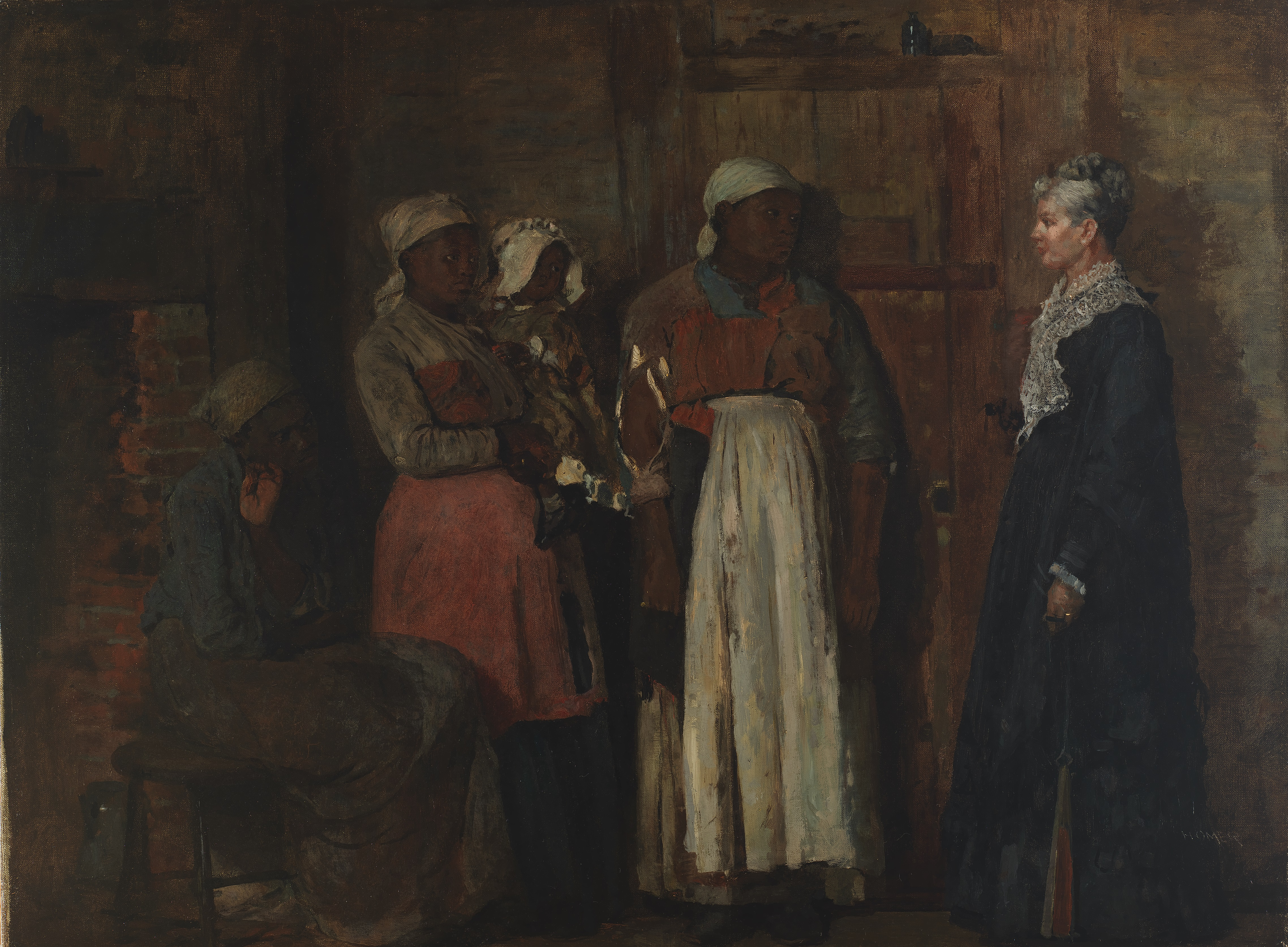
- Artist: Winslow Homer
- Year: 1876
- Medium: Oil on canvas
- Dimensions: 45.7 cm × 61.0 cm (18 in × 24 in)
- Condition: On display
- Location: Smithsonian Museum of American Art; Washington, DC

A Visit from the Old Mistress is an 1876 painting by the American artist Winslow Homer. It was one of several works that Homer is thought to have created during a mid-1870s visit to Virginia, where he had served for a time as a Union war correspondent during the American Civil War. Scholars have noted that the painting's composition is taken from Homer's earlier painting Prisoners from the Front, which depicts a group of captive Confederate soldiers defiantly regarding a Union officer. Put on display in the northern states for a northern audience, A Visit from the Old Mistress, along with Homer's other paintings of black southern life from the Reconstruction era, has been praised as an "invaluable record of an important segment of life in Virginia during the Reconstruction."

== General ==
=== Subject and message ===
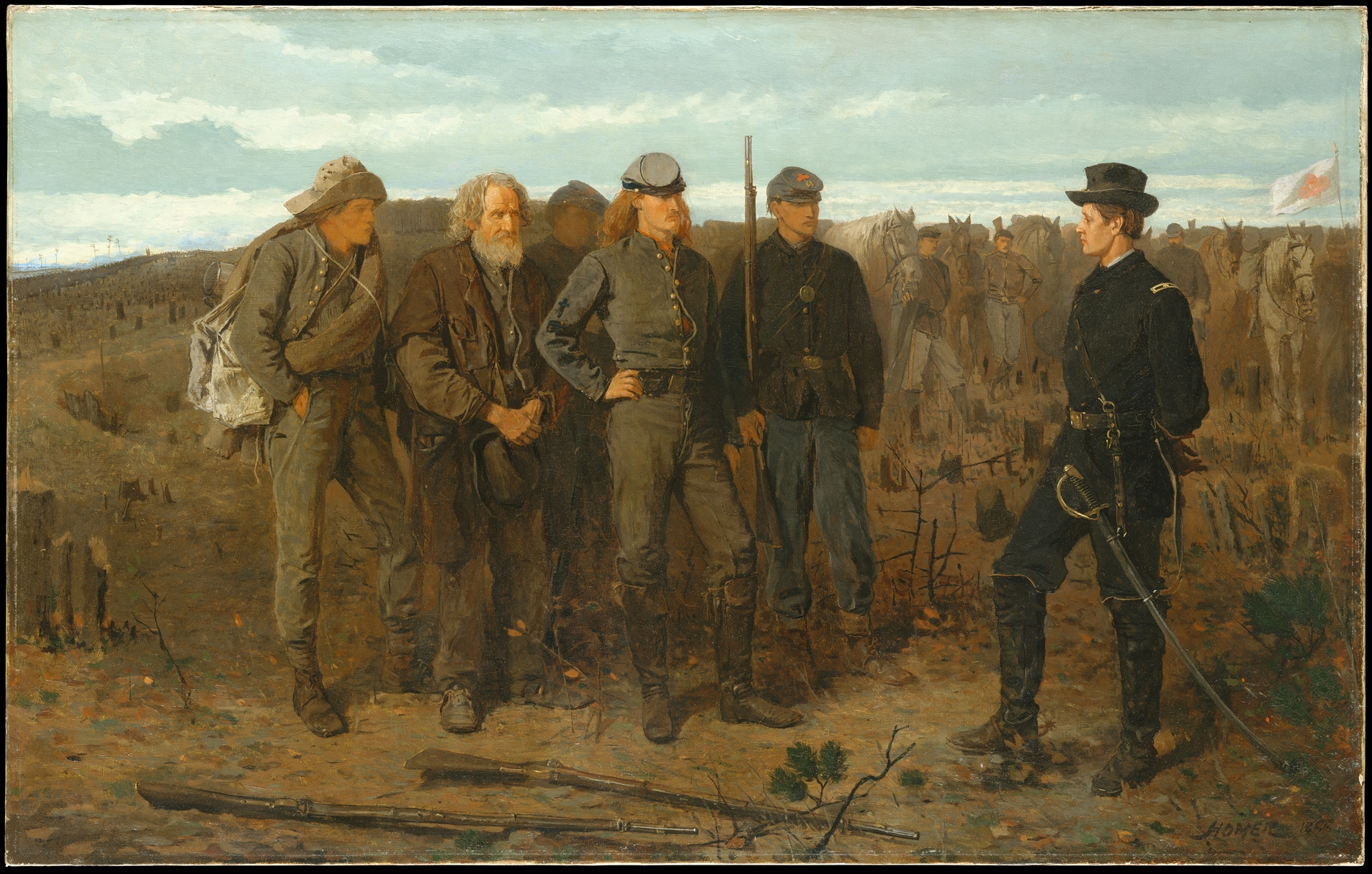
Prisoners from the Front (1866) by Winslow Homer

The left side of the painting shows three Black women dressed in torn clothes, one of whom is sitting, one of whom is standing holding a Black baby, and the third of whom is standing in the middle of the composition. They face an old white woman (the titular Old Mistress) dressed in a widow's black dress with a white lace collar, standing upright and looking evenly at the other subjects. The scene takes place in the cabin belonging to the Black women, even though an alternate title of the piece would place it in the mistress's kitchen. The intended tone of the painting is debated by art historians, with earlier writers suggesting a level of "humor" inherent in the composition, and later commentators insisting that the composition is either intended to relate a message of stubborn resistance on the part of the former slaves to their former mistress, or to create an infantilized and harmless image of recently emancipated Blacks.

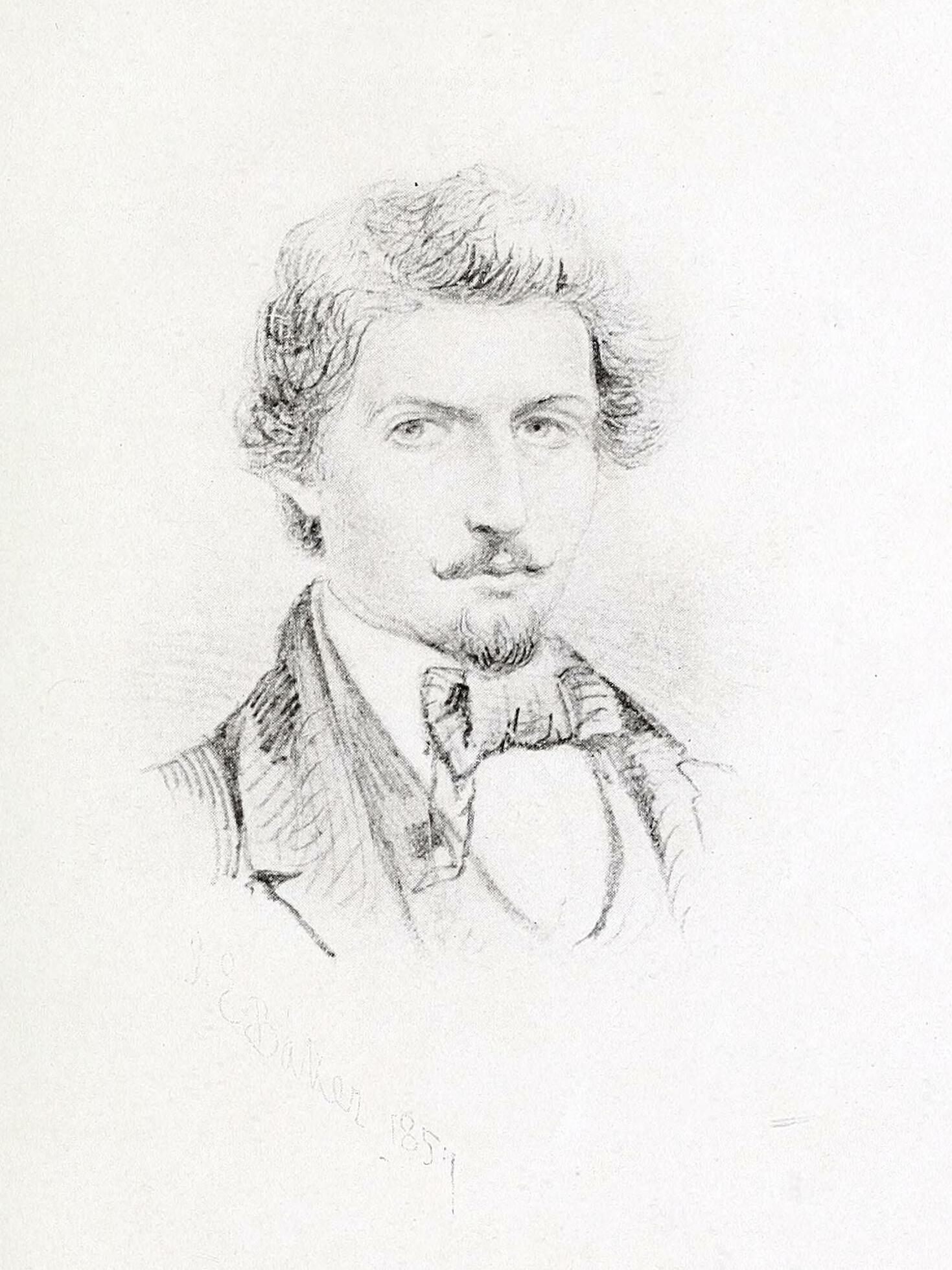
Portrait of Winslow Homer at the Age of Twenty-One by Joseph E. Baker

=== Title and background ===
According to Homer's early biographer William Howe Downes, "Homer's attention had been strongly attracted to the negroes" while he was attached to the Union Army of the Potomac as a war correspondent, and he renewed this interest in 1877 when he took a tour of post-war Virginia and created a string of works focused on primarily black subjects. These works included well-known paintings such as Dressing for the Carnival (1877). According to Downes, "the only known reference to a southern trip was the one he made in 1877," but "the question of when and how often Homer revisited the South after the Civil War" remains open. Whether he had been back to Virginia and had observed a scene like the one in A Visit, or if he had simply composed it from memories assembled during his time in the war, or by means of studio sets, is therefore a matter of speculation. Some scholars maintain that Homer did, in fact, make earlier visits to Virginia in 1875 and 1876, wherein he came to understand blacks not merely as "a humorous object," as they seem to be in some of his Civil War-era sketches, but as serious and fundamentally human subjects in art, paving the way for his much more serious compositions in the 1870s.

The original title, and the title used today, A Visit from the Old Mistress, has a double meaning. Whether the title is intended to mean "a visit from the former mistress" (suggesting that the blacks are now free) or that the title should mean "a visit from the mistress who is old" (suggesting that, despite their emancipation, the former slaves are still under the power of their mistress), is left unclear. The painting has also been catalogued under the titles The Visit to the Mistress (implying that the scene takes place in the mistress's manor) and The Visit of the Mistress (implying that the blacks in the painting remain under the power of their old mistress).

=== Display and ownership ===
The painting was initially purchased by Thomas B. Clarke, a private collector from New York. It changed hands again when Clarke sold his collection in 1899. It was then acquired by William T. Evans, who donated it to the National Gallery of Art in Washington D.C., where it was displayed under the title The Visit of the Mistress. It was later transferred to the Smithsonian American Art Museum, where it remains on display.

A Visit from the Old Mistress was one of five paintings which Homer exhibited at the Paris Universal Exposition of 1878.

== Comparisons ==
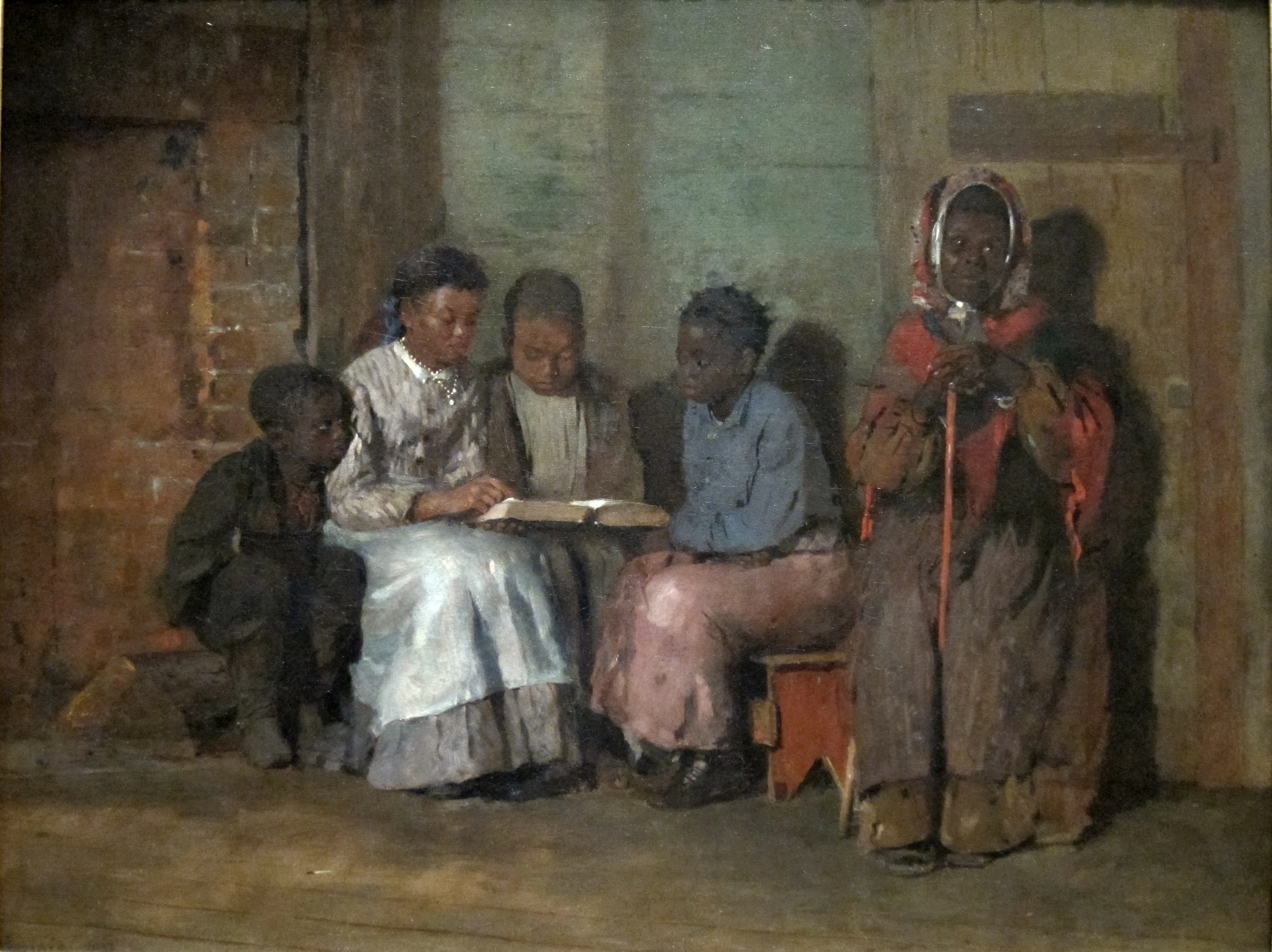
Sunday Morning in Virginia (1877) by Winslow Homer

Scholars have observed that the composition of A Visit from the Old Mistress is nearly identical to that in Homer's earlier work Prisoners from the Front, wherein a band of recently captured Confederate soldiers are shown standing defiantly in the face of their Union captor. This comparison has been used to suggest that A Visit is, like Prisoners, a confrontation scene, implying that the former slaves stand up (or, in one case, pointedly refuse to stand) and boldly face their old mistress, who no longer wields the power she once maintained over their lives.

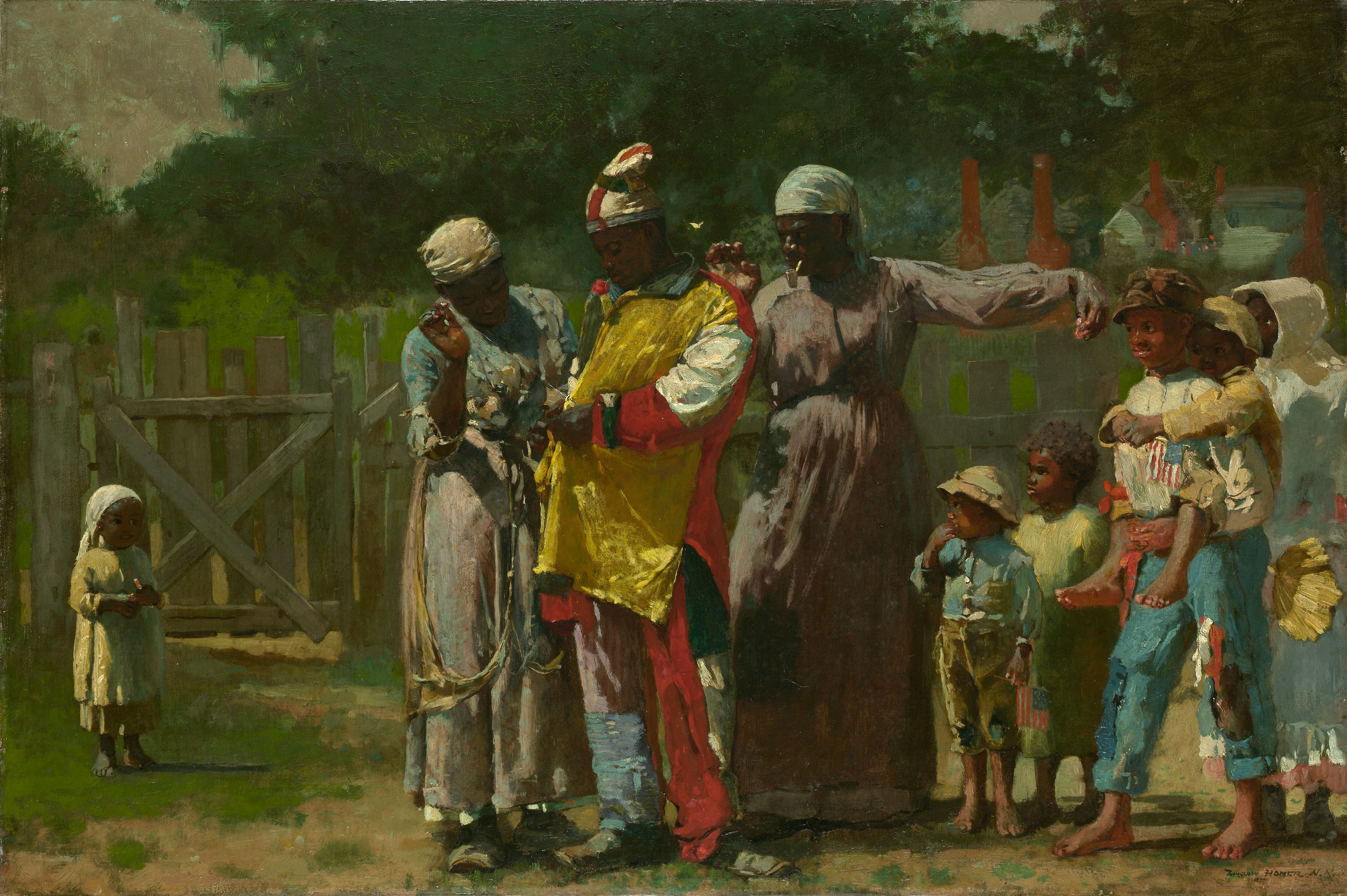
Dressing for the Carnival (1877) by Winslow Homer

The interiors for both A Visit from the Old Mistress and Sunday Morning in Virginia were very likely composed simultaneously, as they both appear to be set in the same room. The subjects in each painting, however, appear to differ.

== Depiction of black subjects ==
The piece was initially received as being an example of Winslow Homer's shift towards realism in the depiction of black subjects, turning away from caricature. A contemporary critic wrote, "Mr. Homer is one of the few men who have been successful in painting the negro character without exaggerating or caricaturing it."

Much modern critical commentary on the piece focuses on the twofold racial implications found within the work, both in the subject of the painting (a white woman, presumably a former slaveowner, standing with her former slaves), and in the very act of the composition of the work itself (Winslow Homer, a white Northerner, creating an image of black Southerners). The early Homer biographer William Howe Downes stated, "the three former slaves are observed and described most vividly and keenly. In their solemnity of demeanor, the humility of their expression, and the evident awe which the presence of the old mistress inspires, there is a blending of pathos and humor, which belongs to the situation, and is all the better for not having been injected into it." Later commentators, such as art historian Jo-Ann Morgan, have incorporated these observations into more critical analyses of the painting. Morgan writes that Homer's "representations of African-Americans as ragged women" were designed to reassure white viewers that there was "no potential to upset existing hierarchies of power." According to this interpretation, "Homer let viewers feel good that slavery was ended, while assuring them that the plantation system persisted. Mapping distinctions in physiques—mistress aloof, ex-slaves slumped; dress—hers fine, theirs ragged; and site—the same old cabin; A Visit from the Old Mistress fixed in place a lateral hierarchy."

This understanding of the painting is challenged by other modern critics such as Sidney Kaplan, who writes:

A blonde, curled mistress, with parasol and lace, seems to expect 'friendship' from her former slaves, but the black matriarch, her great arms at her sides, stands like a cofferdam. She is scarcely a Jemima—not even a Faulknerian Dilsey. Her glance is rejection, a withering of the white delusion of her simplicity, while the eyes and mouths of her family shadow forth nuances of her dignity, scorn, and restraint.

Kaplan argues that the painting is neither a humorous scene, nor a manifestation of blatant white supremacy—rather, it embraces black identity, now freed from the bonds of slavery, and highlights both the "dignity" and independence of the black community, while revealing "a silent tension between two communities seeking to understand their future."

External videos
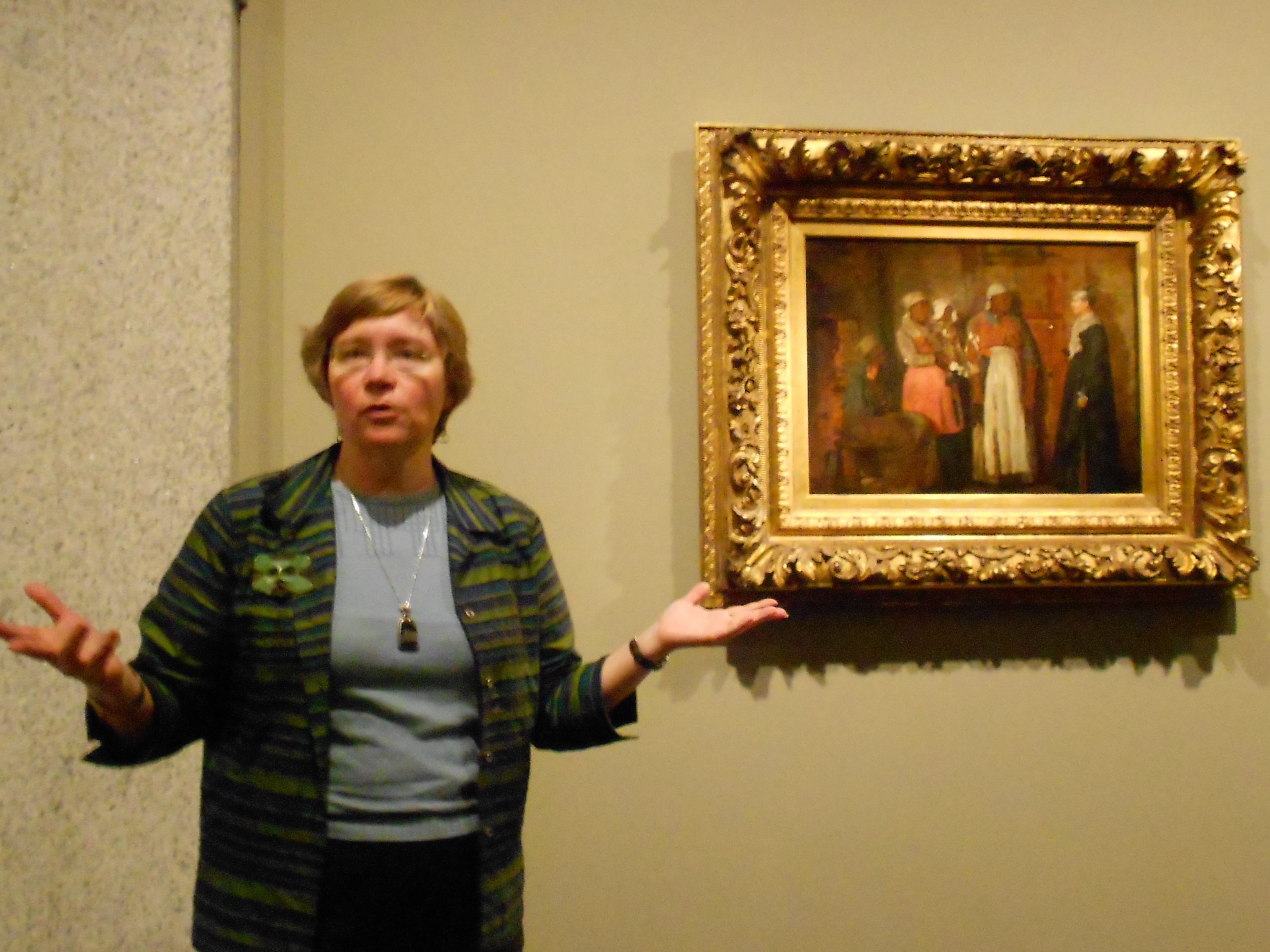
- Podcast: The Civil War and American Art, Episode 5, Smithsonian American Art Museum

== See also ==
- List of paintings by Winslow Homer
