= Bramley =

Bramley may refer to:

== People ==
- Bramley (surname)

== Places ==
=== Australia ===
- Bramley, Western Australia

=== England ===
- Bramley, Derbyshire
- Bramley, Hampshire
  - Bramley Training Area, a British Army training camp
- Bramley, Rotherham, South Yorkshire
- Bramley, Surrey
- Bramley, Leeds
  - Bramley Buffaloes, a rugby league club
  - Bramley R.L.F.C., a defunct rugby league club

=== South Africa ===
- Bramley, Gauteng

== Other uses ==
- Bramley apple, a variety of apple
- "Bramley" is also a term given to a particular shot played in pocket billiards and similar games

== See also ==
- Bromley (disambiguation)
