= Henry Bromley =

Henry Bromley may refer to:

- H. Thomas Bromley (1853–1924), English lawyer
- Henry Bromley (died 1615) (1560–1615), English MP for Plymouth, Worcestershire and Shropshire
- Henry Bromley (died 1670) (1632–1670), English MP for Worcestershire
- Henry Bromley, 1st Baron Montfort (1705–1755), British landowner and politician
- Henry Bromley (writer) (1750?–1814?), real name Anthony Wilson, English writer on art
- Henry Bromley (died 1836) (c. 1761–1836), British MP for Worcester, 1806
- Sir Henry Bromley, 4th Baronet (1816–1895), English cricketer and cricket administrator
- Sir Henry Bromley, 5th Baronet (1849–1905) of the Bromley baronets
