= John Bromley =

John Bromley may refer to:

- John Bromley (translator) (died 1717), English clergyman, Catholic convert, and translator
- John Bromley (politician) (1876–1945), English trade union leader, general secretary of ASLEF 1914–36, and Labour Party Member of Parliament for Barrow-in-Furness 1924–31
- John Bromley (umpire) (born 1968), New Zealand cricket umpire
- John Bromley, designer of Royal Doulton figurines
- Sir John Bromley (soldier) (died 1419), English soldier and landowner at Baddington, Cheshire
- John Bromley (the elder) (c. 1652–1707), plantation owner and English politician
- John Bromley (the younger) (c. 1682–1718), English politician
- John Charles Bromley (1795–1839), English engraver
- John Mallard Bromley (1858–1939), English painter
- John Selwyn Bromley (1913–1985), British naval historian
