= The Veteran in a New Field =

Painting by Winslow Homer

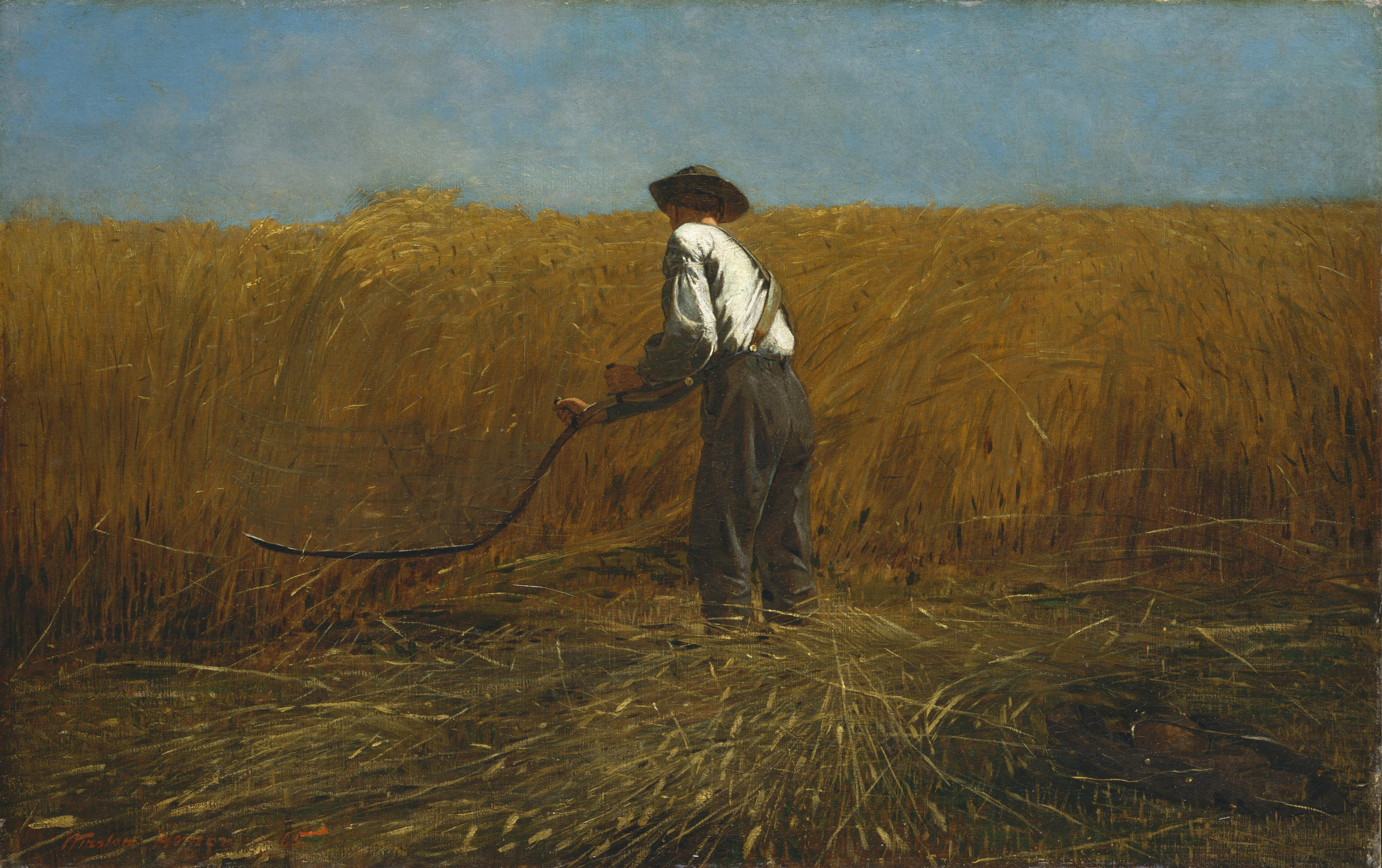
- Artist: Winslow Homer
- Year: 1865
- Medium: Oil on canvas
- Dimensions: 61.3 cm × 96.8 cm (24.1 in × 38.1 in)
- Location: Metropolitan Museum of Art; New York City
- Accession: 67.187.131

The Veteran in a New Field is an oil-on-canvas painting by the 19th-century American artist Winslow Homer. It is set in the aftermath of the American Civil War and is often interpreted as an emblem of postwar American society. The painting depicts a farmer harvesting wheat in a field with a scythe. The farmer in the painting is identified as a former Union soldier from his discarded jacket and canteen in the right foreground of the painting. This painting was one of several that Homer did on the American Civil War, including his previous works Home, Sweet Home and Prisoners from the Front. The Veteran in a New Field is a transitional painting in Homer's body of work. It comments on the postwar return of soldiers to daily life and the history of death that they bring along with them. It uses biblical themes to comment on war and nature, while also alluding to stories from classical history.

Homer finished the painting in 1865, the concluding year of the American Civil War. The painting was donated by Adelaide Milton de Groot to the Metropolitan Museum of Art, where it remains today.

== Description and background ==
This composition is among Homer's simplest, showing the veteran as the sole figure in a field of grain, holding a scythe. The only pieces of evidence that the figure is a Civil War veteran are the jacket and canteen in the lower right hand corner, in the downed wheat. The symbolic use of nature, formality, and expressiveness were all novel elements in Homer's work.

Homer employs a Rückenfigur (a figure seen from behind), which obscures the man's identity and allows him to stand more generally for any soldier that fought for the Union. The jacket and canteen, however, specifically belong to the division that Homer accompanied during his time covering the American Civil War.

== Analysis ==
=== Death ===
One of the important aspects of the painting is the scythe the veteran holds. This scythe has invited comparison with the Grim Reaper, the famous harbinger of death. This emphasizes the farmer's past as a soldier, and war's connection to death. The presence of the veteran harvesting the wheat parallels the massive loss of life in the American Civil War and the "harvesting" of bodies that took place. The veteran's time at war, according to this interpretation, has prepared him for his time in the field, making him more successful at harvesting.

Additionally, the use of wheat as a crop is an important aspect of the painting's commentary on mortality. Wheat had historically been placed on coffins, connecting the crop with death. The veteran is surrounded by wheat, which is sometimes seen as a reminder that the soldier had been surrounded by death during his time at war. Alternatively, the presence of wheat may symbolize the North. Wheat is a northern crop, and was often used on patriotic images during the Civil War period. Additionally, during this time, the North was often said to be "as good as wheat," establishing a connection to the North.

The harvest and death had often been linked in art from earlier eras.

The Veteran in a New Field has also been interpreted as an elegy to Abraham Lincoln, who was assassinated the year the painting was finished. The painting's focus on the North and Union, along with its melancholy tone have led art historians such as Nancy Rash to theorize that the painting itself was made to honor Lincoln and his legacy.

=== Biblical themes ===
The painting references multiple verses from the Bible. The New and Old Testaments contain the phrase "all flesh is grass," which gives the actions of the veteran a double meaning: the veteran is cutting down grass as he once cut down flesh in war, making him both a farmer and a killer.

The painting also references Isaiah 2:4, which speaks of peace after war. The verse calls for former soldiers to "beat their swords into plowshares" to no longer participate in war. This verse parallels the actions of the veteran in the painting, who has stopped participating in war with the end of the American Civil War and instead turned to farming. The veteran has turned in his sword for a scythe, a farming tool like the plowshare. The comparison to Isaiah 2:4 may therefore suggest a call for peace.

=== Homecoming after war ===
When the painting was first shown, it was criticized as an inaccurate depiction of farming. Homer, however, may have deliberately simplified the scene to emphasize symbolic themes, such as the return to pre-war ideals of manly independence. The solitary, emotionless veteran may also imply that the soldiers will be forever marked by the experience of the Civil War. The painting also references a popular homecoming scene of a soldier returning from war to his family and farm. The veteran continues to work on his field in the post-war era, showing a renewed sense of purpose for man as American society tries to come to grips with death and war.

=== Emotional response ===
The Veteran in a New Field has sometimes been seen as suggesting both hope and overwhelming emotions. Scholars see in the harvest a message of rebirth for the nation after the horrors of the American Civil War. Commentators also see the solitary figure of the veteran as a symbol of melancholy and haunting memories.

=== Nature ===
Some scholars see a contrast between the veteran and the surrounding nature. The veteran, according to one view, represents the violence of war, while the surrounding nature represents peace. By placing the somber former soldier within the tranquil scene of nature, the painting shows the potential reunion of man with nature.

Alternatively, the painting has been described as showing the struggle of man against nature. The veteran is surrounded on all sides by wheat, alone, emphasizing the sense of being overwhelmed by nature.

== Comparisons ==
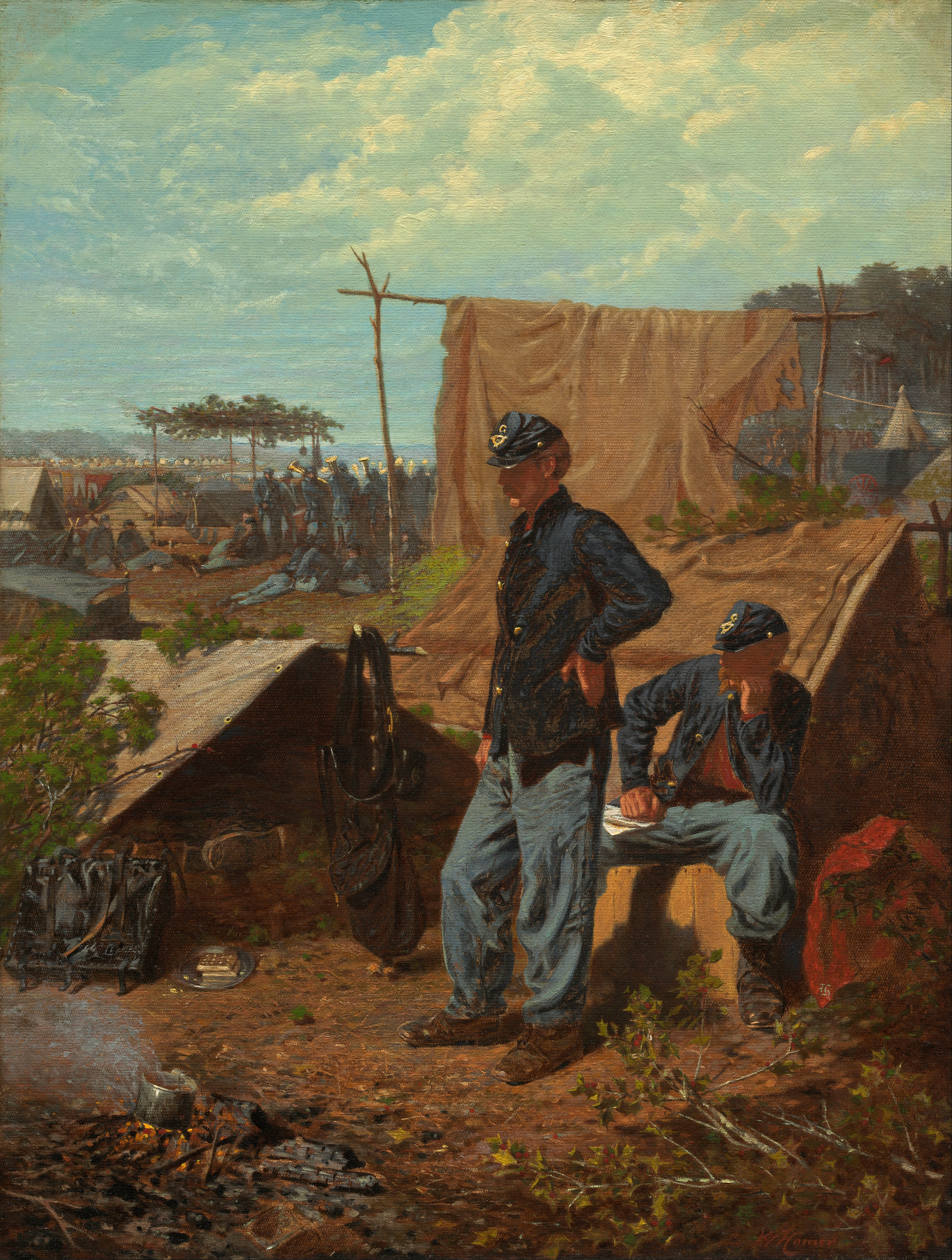
Winslow Homer's Home, Sweet Home

=== Other Civil War works by Homer ===
The Veteran in a New Field is one of Homer's many works related to the Civil War. Departing from earlier Civil War works, such as Home, Sweet Home, Homer moves toward a simplified composition in Veteran in a New Field, marking a transitional moment in his career.

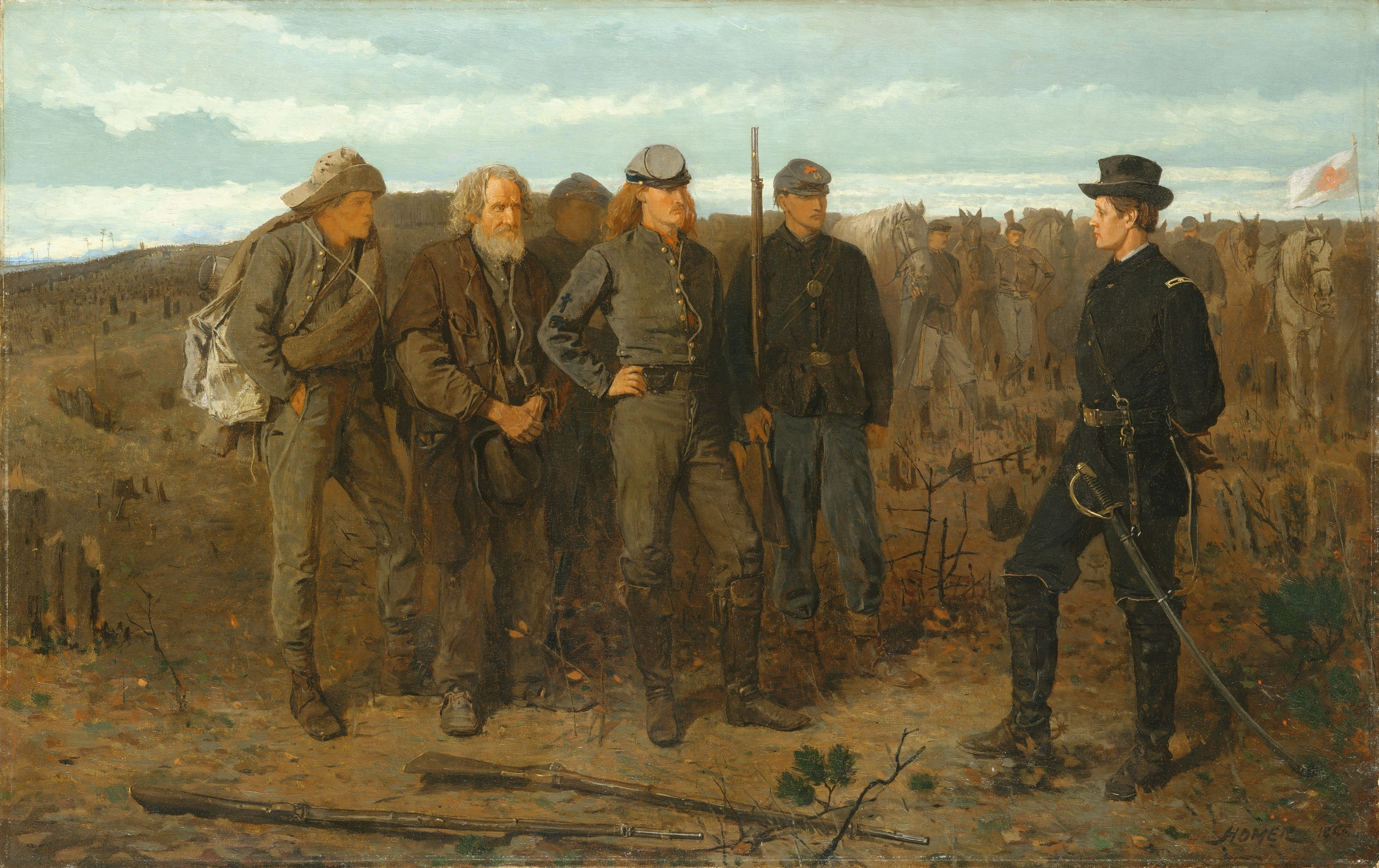
Winslow Homer's Prisoners from the Front

The Veteran in a New Field bears a resemblance to Prisoners from the Front, which Homer painted the following year. Both paintings show Homer moving toward symbolic messages that address the ideological and political tensions of the Civil War. Prisoners from the Front came to be regarded as Homer's greatest work from the period, and the standard for his other paintings.

=== Classical history ===
The veteran in the scene has been compared with Cincinnatus, a famous Roman soldier and politician. Cincinnatus, like the veteran, was called to serve his country. Cincinnatus led the Roman Empire, only maintaining control until he was no longer needed. He peacefully left his post, going back to work on his farm. This parallels the life of the veteran within the painting. The veteran was called to fulfill his duty to his country, and to fight for its survival. After the veteran served his state, he left to work on his farm.

== Reception ==
When The Veteran in a New Field was first exhibited in 1865, it received generally negative reviews. It was said to be painted quickly and sloppily, particularly in the field and in the suggested trees. Critics also objected to the way that the veteran harvests the grain. To harvest grain correctly, a scythe and a cradle is needed, but only a scythe is pictured in the painting.

== See also ==
- List of paintings by Winslow Homer

== See also ==
- Prisoners from the Front
