= John Mallard Bromley =

English painter (1858–1939)

- Born: 1858; London, England
- Died: 1939 (aged 80–81)
- Occupation: Painter

John Mallard Bromley (1858–1939) was an English landscape and marine painter.

== Biography ==
Bromley was born in London in 1858. His father William Bromley III was a painter, his grandfather John Charles Bromley was an engraver, and his great-grandfather William Bromley was also an engraver.

Bromley moved to St Ives, Cornwall, in 1897 and built Quay House. In 1899, he married fellow artist Selena M, Wing. They moved to Torquay in 1901.

Bromley died in 1939. His brothers Valentine Walter Bromley and William John Bromley were also painters.
