= George Bromley =

George Bromley may refer to:

- George Bromley (politician) (c. 1526–1589), MP for Liskeard, Much Wenlock and Shropshire
- George Bromley (athlete), see 1951 in New Zealand
- Sir George Pauncefote-Bromley, 2nd Baronet (1753–1808), of the Bromley baronets
- George Bromley, founder of shoe firm Russell & Bromley

== See also ==
- Bromley (disambiguation)
