= Frederick Bromley (engraver) =

English engraver

- Occupation: Engraver

Frederick Bromley (fl. 1832–1870) was an English engraver.

== Biography ==
Bromley's father, John Charles Bromley, and grandfather, William Bromley, were both engravers as well. His brother, William Bromley III, was a genre painter.

Bromley worked in London from around 1832 to 1870. He exhibited at the Royal Academy and the Suffolk Street Gallery from 1856 to 1860.

Many of his works are at the National Portrait Gallery, London.
