= Thomas Bromley (disambiguation) =

Sir Thomas Bromley (1530–1587) was Lord Chancellor of England.

Thomas Bromley may also refer to:

- Thomas Bromley (chief justice) (died 1555), English judge, chief justice of the King's Bench
- Thomas Bromley (died 1641) (1585–1641), English landowner and politician
- Thomas Bromley, 2nd Baron Montfort (1733–1799), British politician, MP for Cambridge
- H. Thomas Bromley (1853–1924), English artist
- Thomas Eardley Bromley (1911–1987), British ambassador

== See also ==
- Thomas Bromlegh (fl.1421), MP for Hythe
- Bromley (disambiguation)
