= Bramley-Moore =

Bramley-Moore is a double-barrelled surname.

== List of people with the surname ==
- Alwyn Bramley-Moore (1878–1916), Canadian politician from Alberta
- John Bramley-Moore (1800–1886), English politician
- William Bramley-Moore (1831–1918), English cleric

== See also ==
- Bramley-Moore Dock
- Everton Stadium, also known as Bramley-Moore Dock Stadium
- Bramley (surname)
- Moore (surname)
