= Bramley (surname) =

Bramley is a surname. Notable people with the surname include:

- Arthur Bramley (1929–2021), English footballer
- Bart Bramley (born 1948), American bridge player
- Charlie Bramley (1870–1916), English footballer
- Flora Bramley (1904–1993), English-born American actress
- Frank Bramley (1857–1915), English painter
- Fred Bramley (1874–1925), British trade unionist
- Henry Ramsden Bramley (1833–1917), English clergyman and hymnologist
- Joe Bramley (born 1983), New Zealand musician
- Maurice Bramley (1898–1975), New Zealand-born Australian cartoonist
- Peter Bramley (disambiguation), several people
- William Bramley (1928–1985), American actor

== See also ==
- Bramley-Moore
