= The Fifer =

1866 painting by Édouard Manet

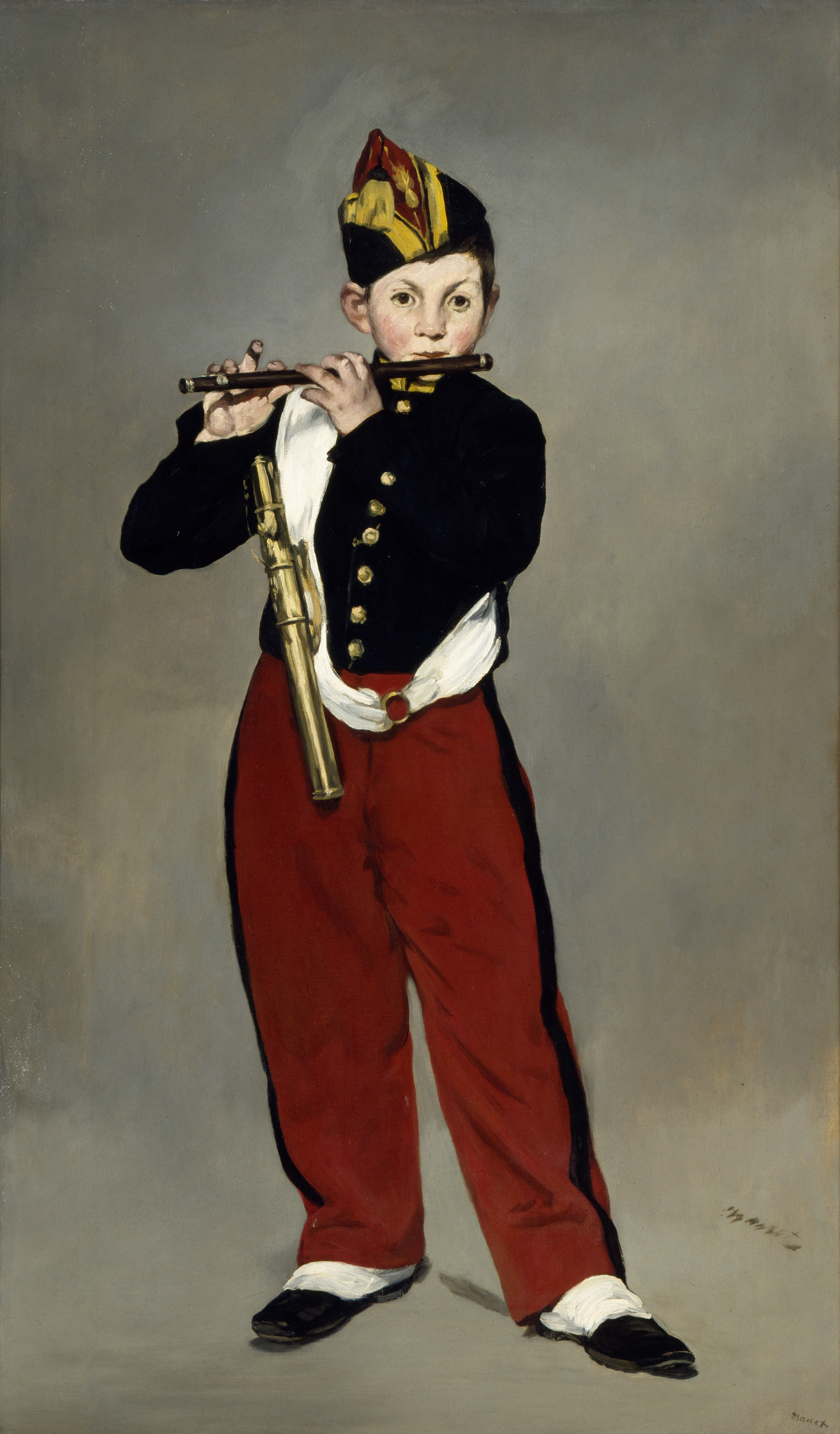
- Artist: Édouard Manet
- Year: 1866
- Type: oil painting
- Dimensions: 160 cm × 97 cm (63 in × 38 in)
- Location: Musée d'Orsay, Paris

The Fifer or Young Flautist is a painting by French painter Édouard Manet, made in 1866. It was in the permanent collection of the Louvre from 1911 to 1986, when it was transferred to Musée d'Orsay, in Paris.

== History ==
On a trip to Spain in 1865, Édouard Manet visited the Museo del Prado, where the art of Diego Velázquez was a revelation. Upon his return to Paris in 1866, he began work on a new painting, depicting an anonymous regimental fifer of the Spanish Army. In this picture, Manet presents the uniformed boy, in a manner that imitates and inverts the formula of Vélazquez's court portraits, against a barely inflected, flattened background of neutral tone, thus frustrating attempts to assess the figure's true size and, by extension, importance.

The painting, entitled Le fifre, was rejected by the jury of the Salon of 1866. Outraged by the jury's decision, Émile Zola, an early champion of Manet's art, published a series of articles in the newspaper L'Évenement, that praised Manet's realist style and modern content. Following the example of Gustave Courbet, in May 1867, Manet personally funded and mounted an exhibition of his own work in a pavilion at the edge of the Éxposition universelle. The exhibition included Le fifre, which was ridiculed in the popular press for its unusual brushwork and inscrutable spatial setting.

The painting was acquired by Durand-Ruel in 1872 and again in 1893. Between 1873 and 1893, the painting was owned by Manet's friend, composer and baritone Jean-Baptiste Faure. It was included in a large exhibition of Manet's work in 1884, a year after his premature death.

Le fifre was accepted by the French government in lieu of taxes on the estate of its last private owner, the Count Isaac de Camondo, and entered the national collections in 1911. It was displayed at the Louvre from 1914 until 1947, when it was relocated to the Musée du Jeu de Paume. It was included in the sweeping Manet retrospective held at the Grand Palais in 1983, the 100th anniversary of the artist's death.

In 1986, it was moved to its current home in the Musée d'Orsay, the national museum of 19th-century art. It has since traveled in exposition; for example, in 2017 and 2018 it was on loan to the Louvre Abu Dhabi museum in Abu Dhabi, UAE.

== Analysis ==
As with a painting by Velázquez, Manet conceived a shallow depth, where vertical and horizontal planes are barely distinguishable. According to Peter H. Feist, in The Player fife, Manet showed the appeal of "the decorative effect of a large single figure, with emphatic contours and placed before a background surface." Against a monochrome background, the figure is boldly highlighted with a reduced palette of colors mostly laid on in a thick impasto which brings forth the very sharp black of the jacket and shoes, along with the red pants, white strap, spats and so on. Thus, the figure stands "firm, smooth and alive."

Moreover, as in Velázquez's work, Manet also portrayed an anonymous character, a teenage musician of the band of the Imperial Guard of Napoleon III, who was sent to Manet by commander Lejosne, "treated like a grandee of Spain." Additional models may have also posed for the figure: the likenesses of both Léon Leenhoff and Victorine Meurent have been seen in the boy's face and figure.

== See also ==
- List of paintings by Édouard Manet
- The museum's Catalogue entry
