= The Reform Banquet =

1834 painting by Benjamin Robert Haydon

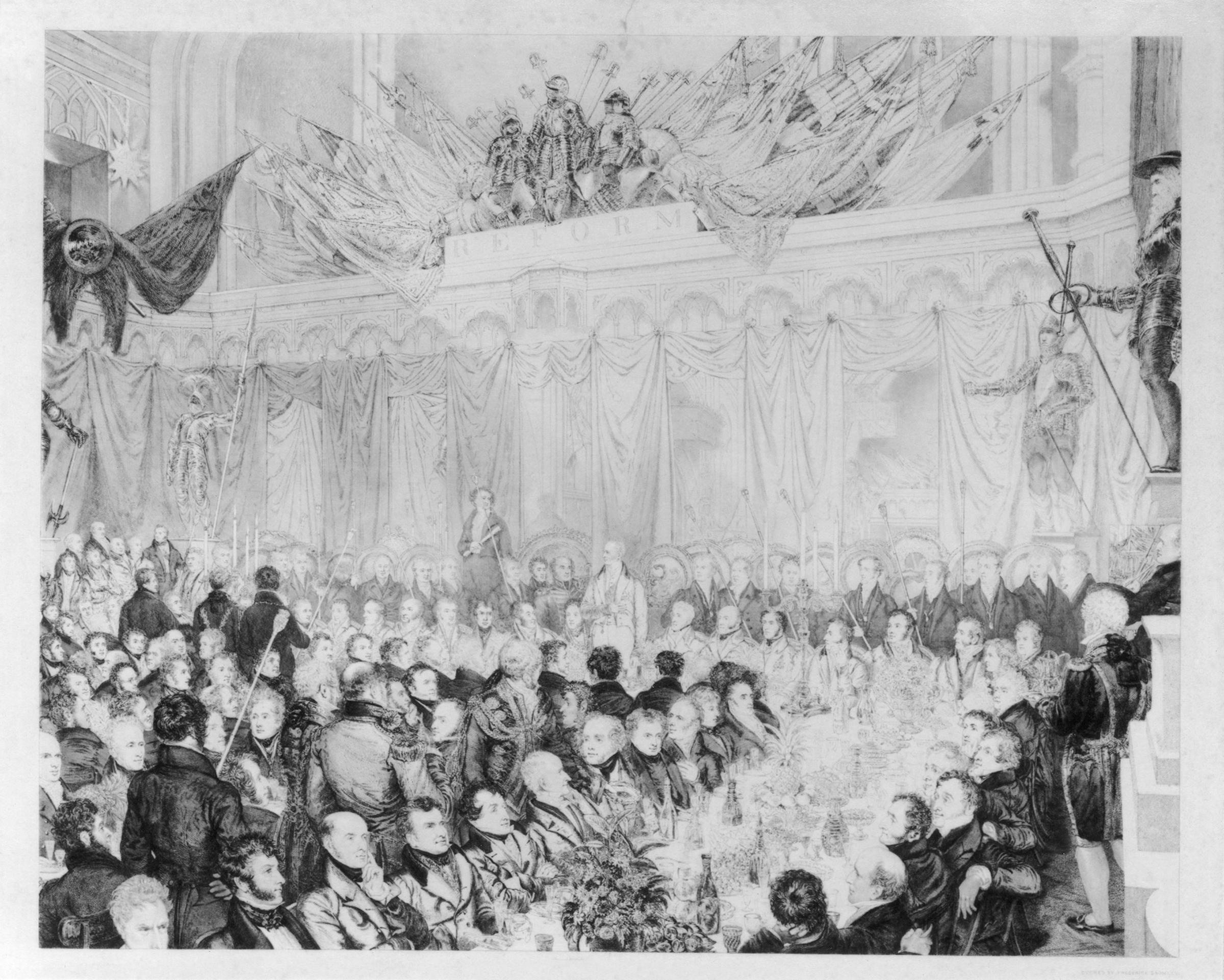
- 1835 engraving by William Bromley
- Artist: Benjamin Robert Haydon
- Year: 1834
- Type: Oil on canvas, history painting
- Dimensions: 240 cm × 370 cm (96 in × 144 in)
- Location: Howick Hall, Howick, Northumberland

The Reform Banquet is a history painting by the English artist Benjamin Robert Haydon. Completed and first exhibited in 1834 it represents a scene on 11 July 1832 when supporters of the recent Reform Act including the Prime Minister Earl Grey and other government ministers met for a celebratory dinner at the Guildhall in the City of London. Comparisons have been drawn between this work and George Hayter's The House of Commons, 1833 which were both large-scale depictions related to the recent Reform Act.

== Commission ==
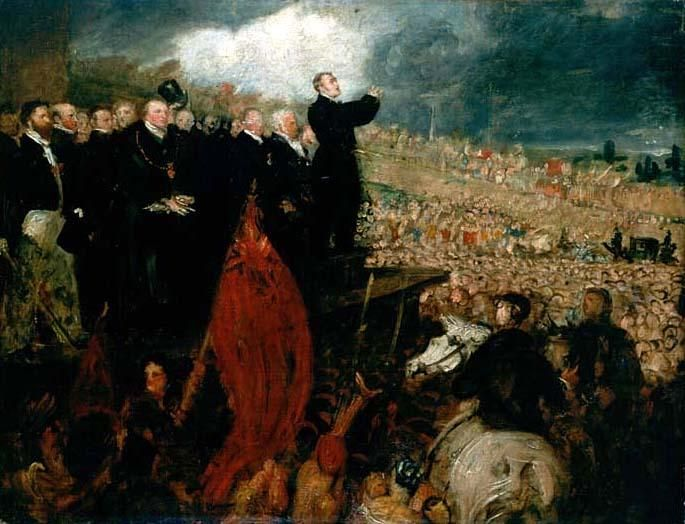
Oil sketch for Haydon's abandoned painting of the Birmingham Political Union meeting.

Haydon (who described himself as a "conservative reformer" to the Tory leader the Duke of Wellington) was a supporter of the recent act. He had previously been working on a large depiction of the Birmingham Political Union. When he approached Grey hoping he would subscribe to financially support the work Grey's obvious disapproval of the Birmingham radicals led to Haydon's suggestion of a depiction of the Whig Party's leaders and the work was commissioned by the Prime Minister. When the Birmingham painting fell through due to the failure of the subscribers to pay the pledged funds Haydon abandoned it at the stage of an oil sketch and turned his full attention to the Grey commission.

== Sitters ==
Haydon attended the actual dinner in July 1832 and drew up an initial sketch as he began working on the composition of the final painting before moving on to filling it out with individual portraits. This led to a large number of sittings to develop the images for the various number of participants that Haydon did in chalk. this process lasted from September 1832 to early 1834.. One of the hardest figures to pin down was the Lord Chancellor Henry Brougham although he eventually sat for the painting. Grey himself was distracted by the international situation due to the Belgian Revolution and subsequent Siege of Antwerp, making it difficult to schedule sittings. A number of prominent figures who hadn't attended the actual dinner were still portrayed, shown standing as a group on the left of the canvas. Haydon shows the gathering during the dessert course when Grey gave a speech to the assembled dignitaries. Amongst the cabinet ministers to feature were the Home Secretary future Prime Minister Lord Melbourne, the Chancellor of the Exchequer Lord Althorp, the Marquess of Lansdowne, Lord Auckland, Lord John Russell, the Earl of Ripon and the Duke of Richmond.

Others to appear were Joseph Hume, Duke of Cleveland, the Marquess of Westminster, Lord Ebrington, Sir Francis Burdett, Daniel O'Connell, Francis Jeffrey and the Lord Mayor of London. The Duke of Sussex the younger brother of the king also sat for the painting and had helped draw up the list of sitters to be included. The artist added himself to the picture, halfway up the extreme right of the painting.

== Exhibition ==
Haydon who had a long-standing grudge against the Royal Academy and did not exhibit the work at the Academy's Summer Exhibition. Instead, as he had done before, he hired space at Hickman's Great Room in St James's Street to display the painting. He held a private view on 22 March 1834 and it opened to the general public a few days later. While the pro-Reform The Times concluded that it was "worthy of the great event it commemorates" a more scathing review appeared in the Tory-supporting Fraser's Magazine.

The exhibition proved a financial disaster, losing him money. Haydon attributed this to the middle classes in particular staying away, rejecting the painting due to its close association with an unpopular government. The finished work is now at Howick Hall in Northumberland, Earl Grey's country estate, where it hangs adjacent to a portrait of Grey by Thomas Lawrence. Versions of the engraving done by William Bromley in 1835 are now in the collections of the Royal Collection and the National Portrait Gallery.

== See also ==
- The Anti-Slavery Society Convention, 1840, an 1841 work by the artist featuring another group gathering

== Bibliography ==
- Carlisle, Janice. Picturing Reform in Victorian Britain. Cambridge University Press, 2012.
- Hamilton, James. A Strange Business: Making Art and Money in Nineteenth-Century Britain. Atlantic Books Ltd, 2014.
- Macdonald, Stuart. The History and Philosophy of Art Education. James Clarke & Co., 2004.
- O'Keeffe, Paul. A Genius for Failure: The life of Benjamin Robert Haydon. Random House, 2011.
