= Bromley (disambiguation) =

Bromley is a district of south east London, England, historically a market town in Kent.

Bromley may also refer to:

== People ==
- Bromley (surname)

== Places ==
=== United Kingdom ===
- London Borough of Bromley, a local government district in London, named after the town of Bromley
- Municipal Borough of Bromley, a former local government district
- Bromley (constituency), a former UK Parliament constituency
- Bromley (electoral division), a former Greater London Council electoral division
- Bromley-by-Bow, a district of east London in the London Borough of Tower Hamlets
- Abbots Bromley, a village in East Staffordshire
- Bromley Cross, an area of the Metropolitan Borough of Bolton, Greater Manchester
- Great Bromley, a village in Essex
- Little Bromley, a village in Essex
- Bromley, South Yorkshire, a hamlet in the parish of Wortley, in the Metropolitan Borough of Barnsley
- Bromley, West Midlands, a village in the Black Country
- Bromley Heath, in Gloucestershire, an outer suburb of Bristol

=== United States ===
- Bromley, Alabama, an unincorporated community in Baldwin County
- Bromley, Iowa, a former village in Minerva Township, Marshall County
- Bromley, Kentucky, a town in the US state of Kentucky
- Bromley Mountain, a mountain in the US state of Vermont
- Bromley, Vermont, the original name of the town of Peru, Vermont

=== Other ===
- Bromley, New Zealand, a suburb of Christchurch
- Bromley, Zimbabwe, a village
- Bromley Rock Provincial Park, British Columbia, Canada
- Admaston/Bromley, Ontario, Canada

== Other uses ==
- Bromley (company), amalgamated into the South Suburban Co-operative Society
- Bromley Contingent, a Sex Pistols fan group
- Bromley equation, an equation for calculating activity coefficients for electrolytes in aqueous solution
- Bromley F.C., the football club from the town of Bromley, England
- Bromley, a childhood friend of Prince Derek in The Swan Princess trilogy

== See also ==
- Bramley (disambiguation)
- Bromley: Light After Dark, a 2023 Australian film about the artist David Bromley
