= Peter Bramley =

Peter Bramley may refer to:

- Peter Bramley (director), English actor and theatre director
- Peter Bramley (biochemist) (born 1948), British biochemist
- Peter Bramley (cricketer) (1785–1838), English cricketer
