= Queen Victoria at Osborne =

Painting by Edwin Landseer

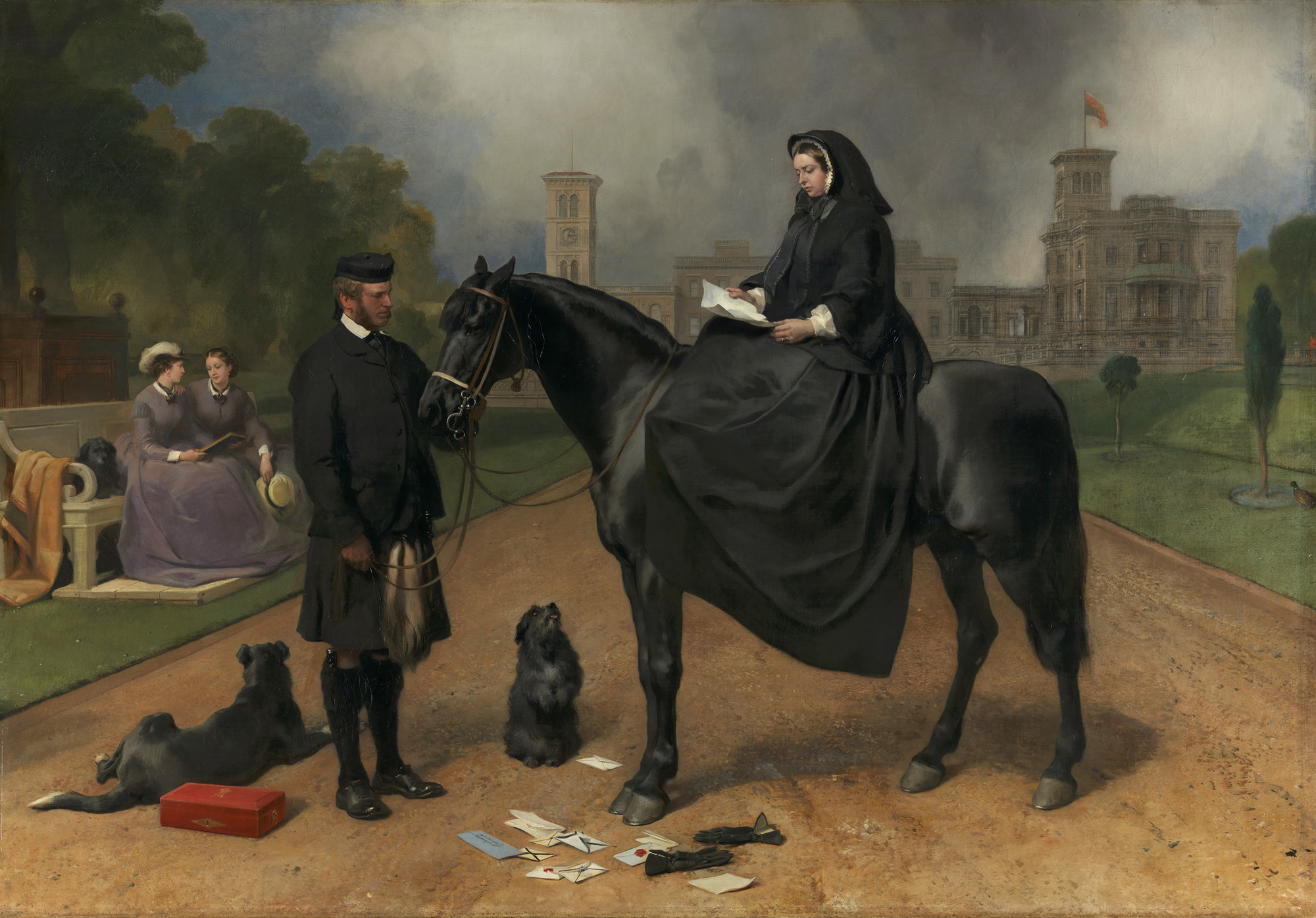
- Artist: Edwin Landseer
- Year: 1866
- Type: Oil on canvas, portrait painting
- Dimensions: 375 cm × 538 cm (147.8 in × 211.9 in)
- Location: Royal Collection

Queen Victoria at Osborne is an 1866 oil painting by the British artist Edwin Landseer. It depicts a view at Osborne House, the royal residence on the Isle of Wight. Queen Victoria is shown on her pony, with John Brown in attendance. Two of her daughters Princess Helena and Princess Louise are seated nearby while the buildings of Osbourne can be seen in the background. The queen wears back mourning clothes for her husband Prince Albert.

Following the death of Albert in 1861, Victoria had the idea of Landsee producing two paintings on them of sunshine and sorrow. The first features a happy day at Balmoral with Albert before his death, while the latter would focus on the queen following her bereavement. The painting was displayed at the Royal Academy"s Summer Exhibition of 1867 at the National Gallery in London. It remains part of the Royal Collection in the Horn Room at Osborne House.

== Bibliography ==
- Kinzler, Julia. Representing Royalty: British Monarchs in Contemporary Cinema, 1994-2010. Cambridge Scholars Publishing, 2018.
- Marsden, Jonathan. Victoria & Albert: Art & Love. Royal Collection, 2010.
- Ormond, Richard. Sir Edwin Landseer. Philadelphia Museum of Art, 1981.
