= William Bromley III =

English genre painter

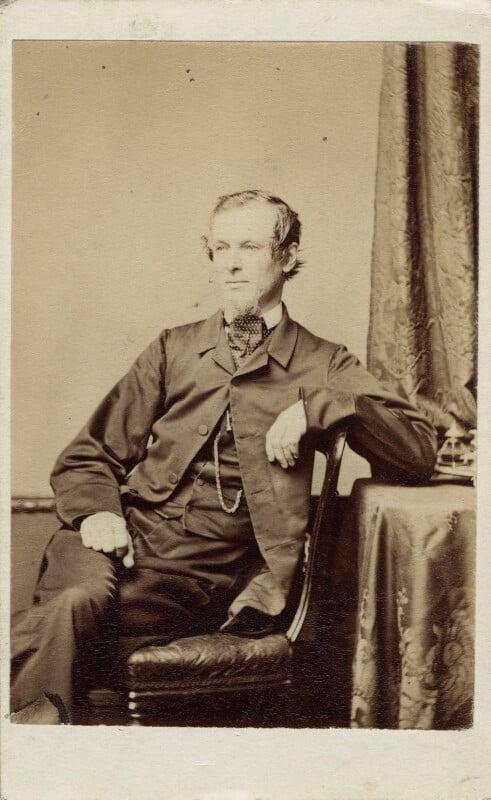
- Born: 1816; Byfleet, Surrey, England
- Died: 1890 (aged 73–74); Marylebone, London, England
- Occupation: Genre painter

William Bromley III (1816–1890) was an English genre painter.

== Biography ==
Bromley was born in Byfleet, Surrey, England, in 1816. His father, John Charles Bromley, and grandfather, William Bromley, were both engravers. His brother, Frederick Bromley, was also an engraver.

Bromley debuted his work at the British Institution in 1843. He exhibited at the Royal Academy from 1844 to 1870.

Bromley died in Marylebone, London, in 1890. He had seven children, including three painters Valentine Walter Bromley, William John Bromley, and John Mallard Bromley.

Katherine of Aragon and the Cardinals, 1866, Manchester Art Gallery

His artwork was later included at various institutions, including the Manchester Art Gallery, the Russell-Cotes Art Gallery & Museum, and the Wolverhampton Art Gallery.
