= Scene from the Steeplechase: The Fallen Jockey =

Painting by Edgar Degas

Scene from The Steeplechase: The Fallen Jockey
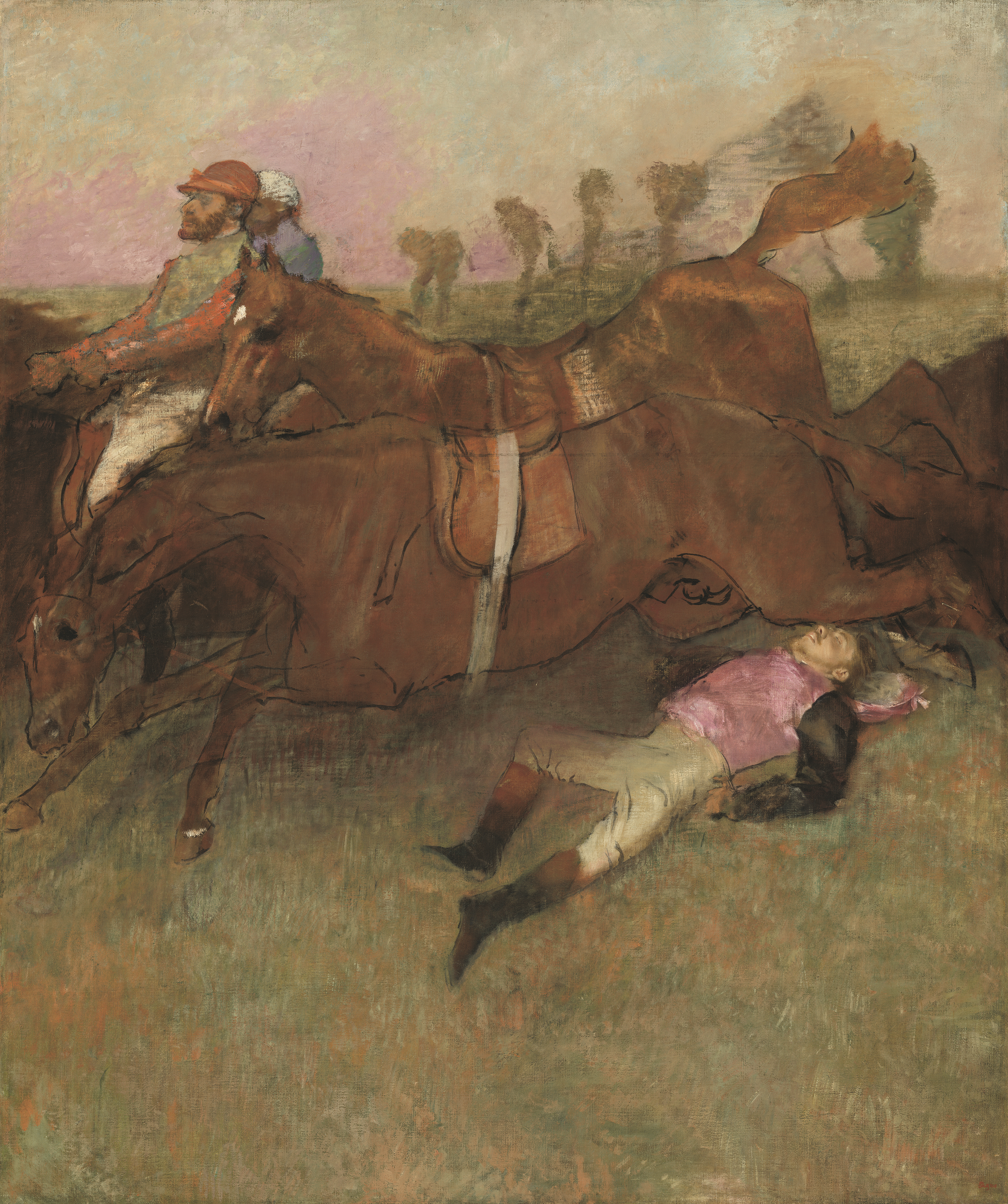
- Artist: Edgar Degas
- Year: 1866 (reworked in 1880–81 and again c. 1897)
- Medium: Oil on canvas
- Movement: Impressionism
- Dimensions: 180 cm × 152 cm (71 in × 60 in)
- Location: The National Gallery of Art, Washington, D.C.

Scene from the Steeplechase: The Fallen Jockey is an 1866 oil-on-canvas painting by Edgar Degas. Degas reworked the painting on multiple occasions, once in 1880–81, and again in 1897. The painting, now on display in the National Gallery of Art in Washington, D.C., was exhibited at the 1866 Salon in Paris.

Degas painted the work on a large canvas. Horses race from the right to left side. In total, there are four horses, with three jockeys. One of the jockeys has fallen off his horse and lies motionless in the foreground. Degas's interest in the subject and his motivation to paint the scene have been subject of art historical debate.

According to Mary Cassatt's mother, Katherine Cassatt, Degas said of the painting: "It is one of those works which are sold after a man's death and artists buy them not caring whether they are finished or not."

== Background ==
It is likely that Degas was introduced to equestrian life around 1861. His visits to Normandy and his friend Paul Valpinçon's estate there inspired him.It is also possible that Degas was designing experimental canvases without having visited a racetrack.

=== Motivation ===
In the years before painting the work, Degas's father warned him that he would have to support himself. Degas, like other members of his family, wasn't ready to provide for himself yet.As an artist, he understood that exhibiting at the Salon would provide opportunities for professional success. He had exhibited Scene of War in the Middle Ages at the Salon in 1865. Although the painting was considered original, it did not receive extensive praise from critics.

Degas decided to pivot to a very fashionable subject, the steeplechase. Steeplechases were relatively new in France. The Société des Steeple-chases was founded just three years before this painting. The steeplechases attracted an upper-class audience due to the fact that riders were not jockeys, but "gentlemen".Audiences relished the excitement and risk of the race, where horses and their riders competed by surmounting various obstacles on the course. To ensure that his piece would not be overlooked, Degas chose a large canvas, 180 by 152 centimeters. This painting may have signaled Degas's transition from history paintings to "modern" paintings.

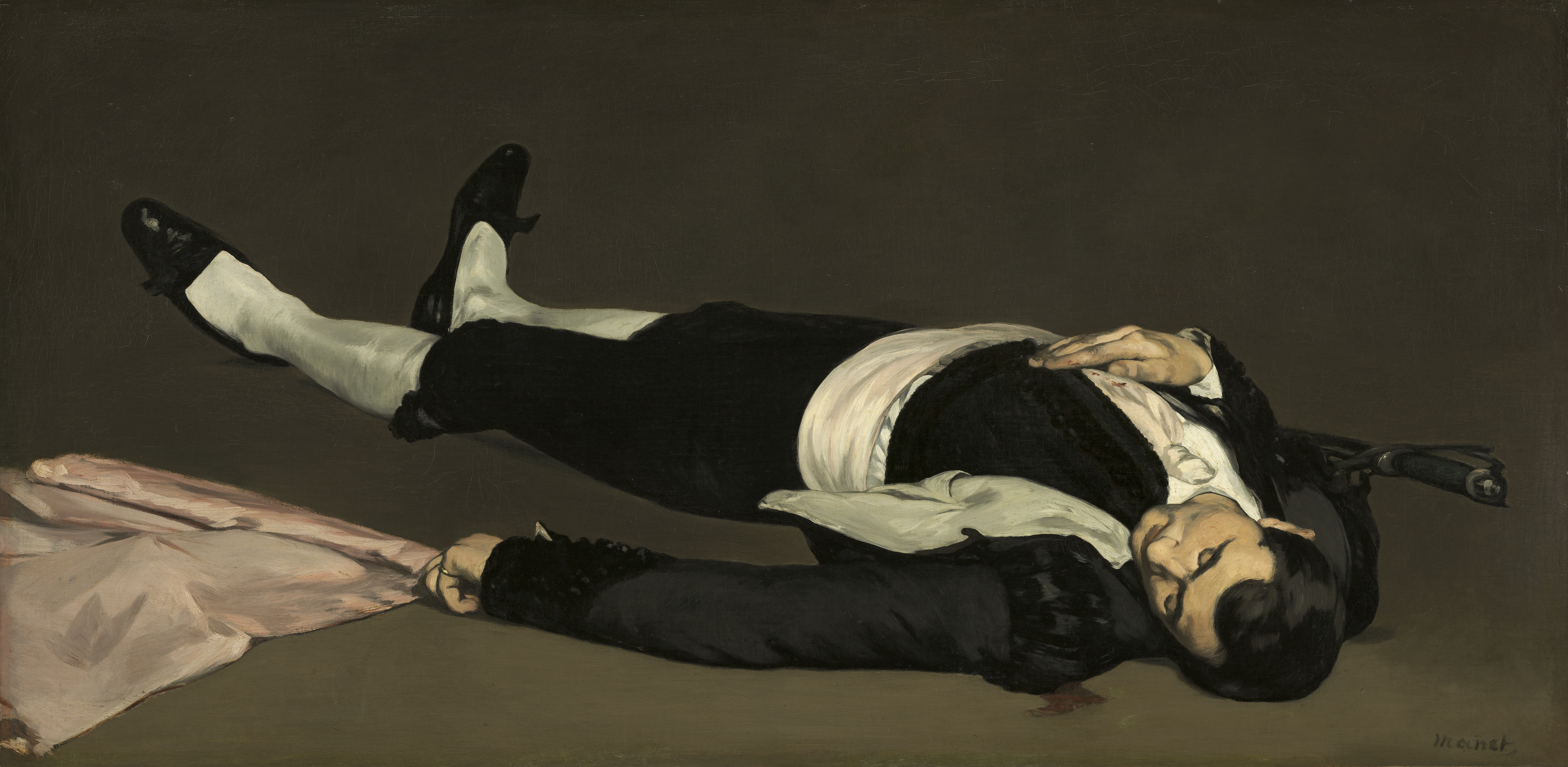
Edouard Manet, The Dead Man, 1864.

Degas may have been further influenced by his rivalry with Edouard Manet. Manet's Incident in the Bullring, exhibited at the Salon of 1864, featured a similar subject and composition: an athlete injured in a dangerous competition and animals producing a sense of chaos above (Manet later cut down the painting to include only the reclining bullfighter, and the work is now known as The Dead Man).

== Analysis and interpretation ==
Degas's placement of figures allows the viewer to focus on the foreground and the fallen jockey. Other typical attendees of the steeplechase, such as spectators and stewards, are not present. This draws concern to the jockey and the question as to whether he is alive or dead. There is a sense of drama and danger in the scene. The empty slope below the riders is unusual. The viewer can grasp the size of the horses as they stampede across the canvas, with the jockey lying below. The shadows of horses are impressive, and mirror their movement across the canvas.

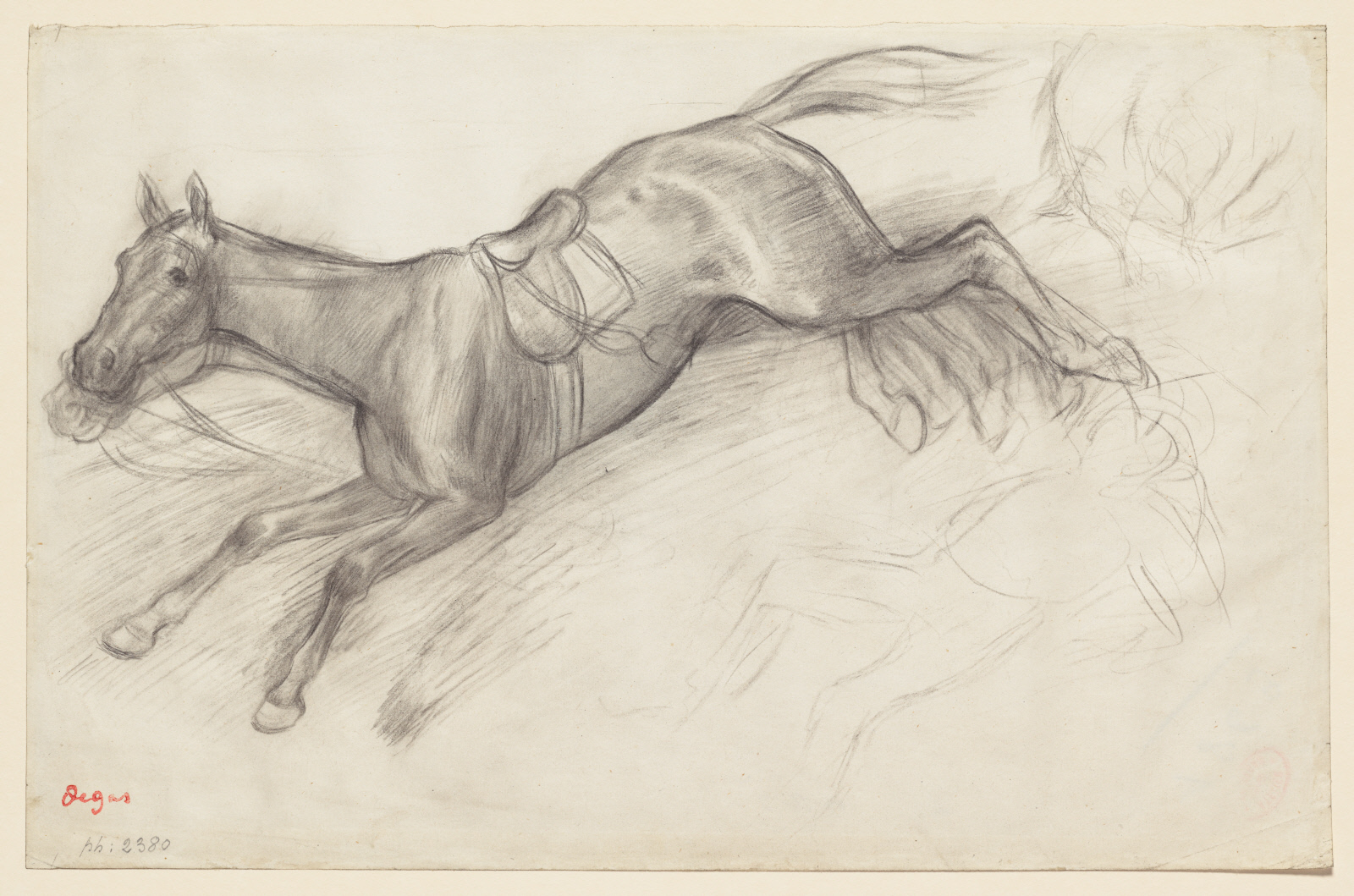
Degas' horse movement sketch for Scene from The Steeplechase: The Fallen Jockey

It has been argued that Degas's friend Ludovic-Napoléon Lepic is the mounted rider with the red cap in the painting, while sculptor Raymond de Broutelles is the rider with the white cap in the back left on the canvas.

The horses in Degas's sketches and in the painting itself convey a desire for freedom. There is a great sense of movement and pace derived from the motion and brush strokes in the front horse.

Scholars have devoted much attention to the identity of the fallen jockey. It is possible the fallen jockey is modeled after one of Degas's brothers. René Degas might have posed as the jockey. However, his brother Achille is known to have posed for jockeys in Degas's other works. Degas's drawings show a figure which closely resembles Achille due to his hair, beard, and sideburns.

Scholars have also addressed the intended meaning of the jockey's position. Some have seen the jockey's fall as an exploration of weakness. Degas may have been criticizing his brother Achille by depicting him in this way. In fact, Achille was seen as a failure within the family.

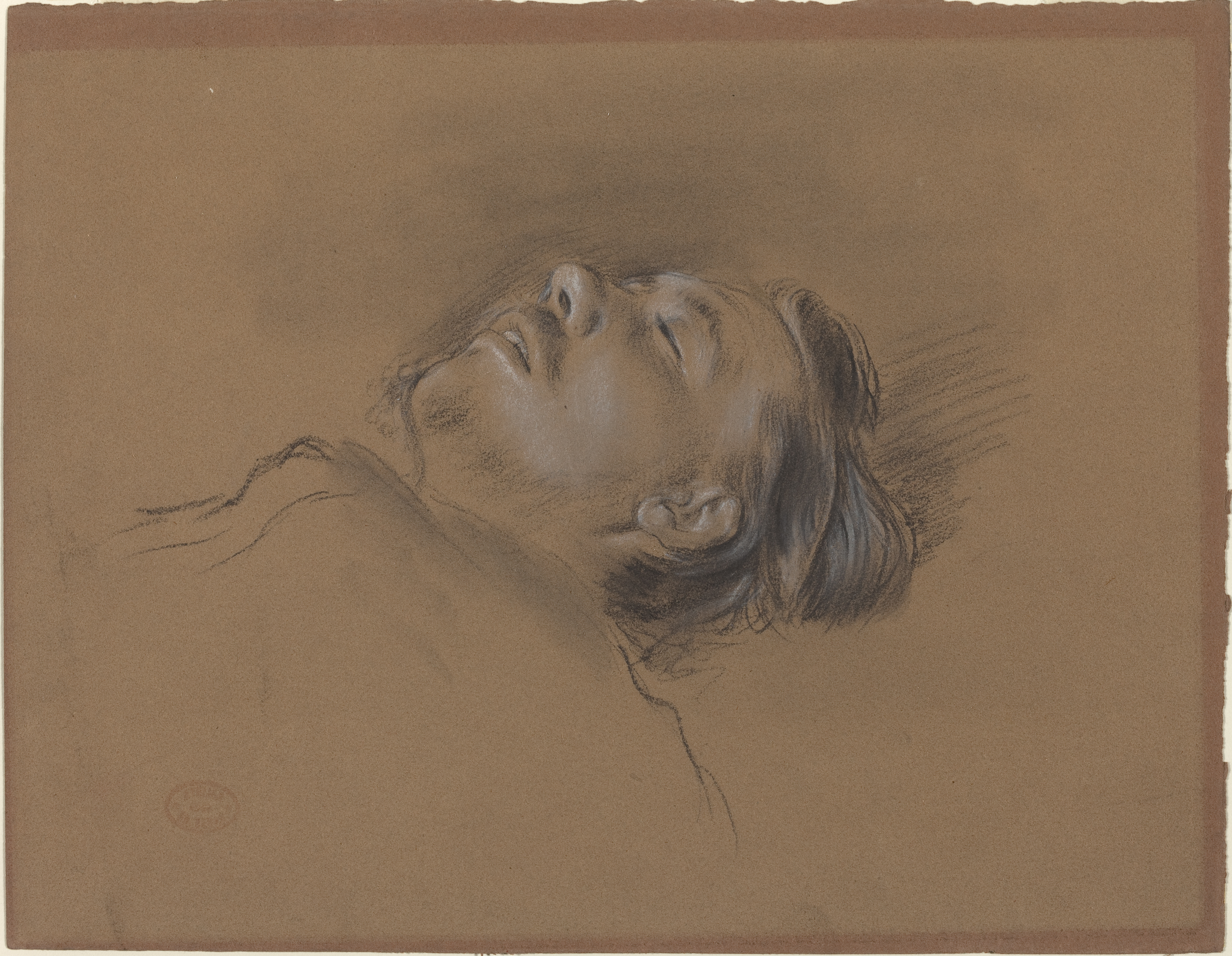
Degas' sketch for the head of the fallen jockey

== Reception and reworking ==
The public response from the exhibition was not as dramatic as Degas had wanted. Much of critical attention at the Salon centered around Gustave Courbet's Woman with a Parrot.One anonymous critic wrote of Degas's painting, "Like the jockey, the painter is not yet entirely familiar with the horse." Thirty-one years later, Degas agreed with the critic, saying "I was totally ignorant of the mechanism that regulates a horse's movements."

After the Salon of 1866, Degas was displeased with his work. He repainted the scene in the early 1880s and in 1897. Degas may have been motivated to repaint it in the 1880s by his friend Mary Cassatt. Her brother was fond of horses, and she asked Degas to sell the painting to him. The jockey remained untouched in Degas's reworkings.

At some point, the art dealer Joseph Durand-Ruel bought the work for 9,000 Francs and had another artist restore the lines of the horses.As Degas considered the painting "spoiled", he painted another version of the work, titled Fallen Jockey, in 1896, depicting one horse and a fallen jockey in an open field.
