= Bromley, West Midlands =

Suburb of Kingswinford, West Midlands, England

Coordinates: 52.489°N 2.145°W

Bromley is a residential area of Kingswinford, West Midlands, England.

It was a rural area for many centuries, mostly consisting of farmland, but since the Second World War has been extensively developed for upmarket private housing. Principle bus routes through the area are service 15/15A between Wolverhampton and Merry Hill Centre and service 226 between Dudley and the Merry Hill Centre. These are operated by National Express West Midlands and Diamond Bus respectively. A Tesco Express is located on Bromley Lane in the former Fox and Goose public house.

== Education ==
There is a primary school in Bromley, the Bromley Pensnett Primary School.

Since the 1960s it has been home to The Crestwood School, a secondary school located on Bromley Lane.

== Religion ==
There is a Methodist church in Bromley, the building opened in 1990.
