= The Arab Tent =

Painting by Edwin Landseer

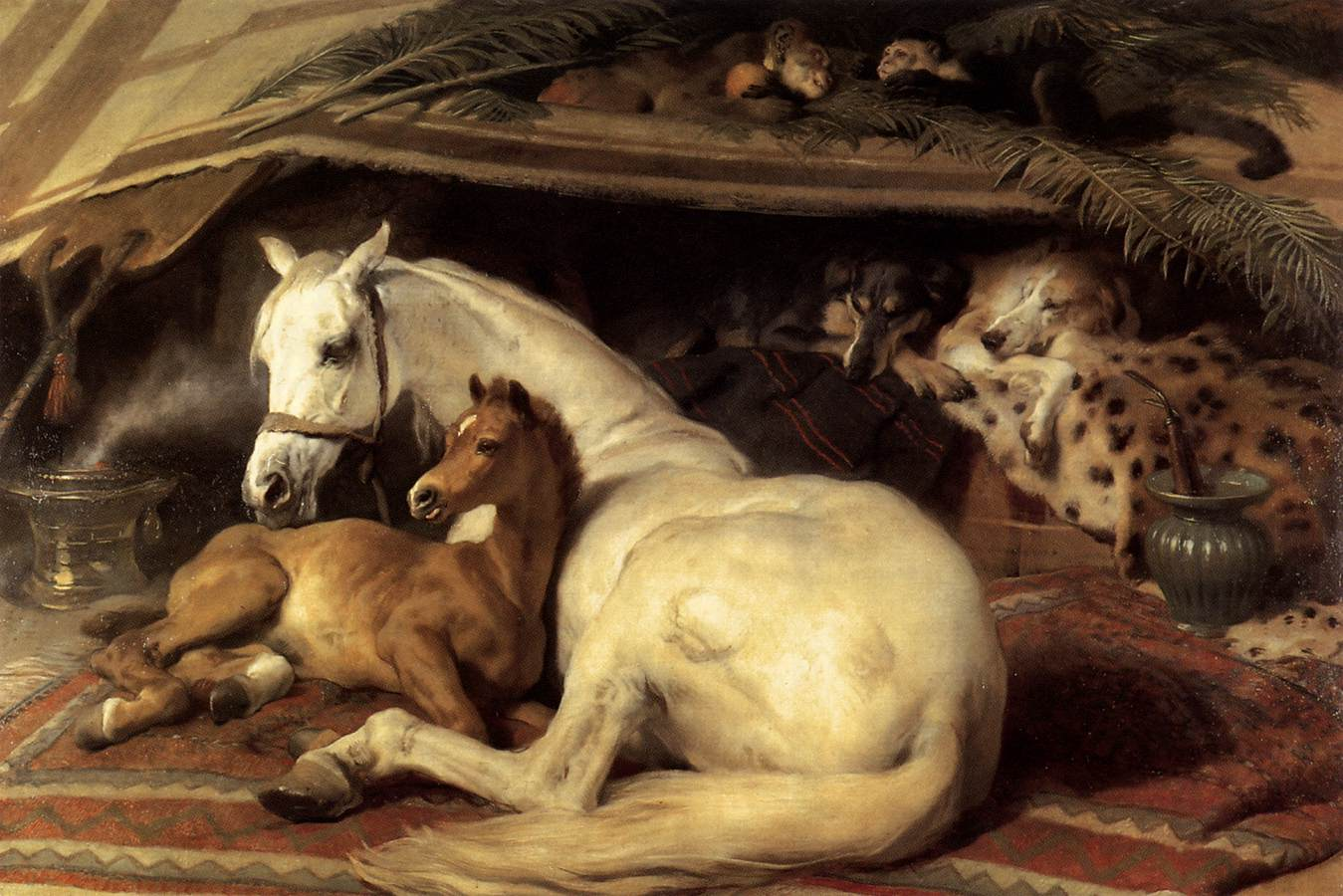
- Artist: Edwin Landseer
- Year: 1866
- Type: Oil on canvas, genre painting
- Dimensions: 154 cm × 226 cm (61 in × 89 in)
- Location: Wallace Collection, London

The Arab Tent is an 1866 oil painting by the British artist Edwin Landseer. It depicts a mare with her foal along with two Persian Greyhounds and two monkeys The painting is a rare example of Landseer, a well-known animal painter of the Victorian era, venturing into the Orientalist themes then fashionable. It was displayed at the Royal Academy's Summer Exhibition of 1866 at the National Gallery under the title The Indian Tent. Today it is part of the Wallace Collection in Marylebone, having been acquired by Sir Richard Wallace from the Prince of Wales in 1878 for the large sum of £6,300.

== Bibliography ==
- Baskett, John. The Horse in Art. Yale University Press, 2006.
- Ingamells, John. The Wallace Collection: British, German, Italian, Spanish. Wallace Collection, 1985.
- Ormond, Richard. Sir Edwin Landseer. Philadelphia Museum of Art, 1981.
