= David Bromley =

David Bromley may refer to:

- David G. Bromley (born 1941), American professor of sociology
- David Allan Bromley (1926–2005), Canadian–American physicist and academic administrator
- David Bromley (artist) (born 1960), Australian artist
