= Katherine of Aragon and the Cardinals =

Painting by William Bromley

- Artist: William Bromley
- Year: 1866
- Type: Oil on canvas, history painting
- Dimensions: 107.5 cm × 153.5 cm (42.3 in × 60.4 in)
- Location: Manchester Art Gallery, Manchester

Katherine of Aragon and the Cardinals is an 1866 history painting by the British artist William Bromley. It depicts a scene from Tudor England when Catherine of Aragon meets with the two Cardinals Thomas Wolsey and Lorenzo Campeggio, the latter the Papal legate sent to judge the grounds for her husband Henry VIII's attempts to divorce her. She resists their attempts to avoid a public trial of the accusations against her.

Although a history scene, the actual inspiration for the painting was William Shakespeare's play Henry VIII.

The picture is now in the collection of Manchester Art Gallery, having been acquired through a 1910 bequest by Henrietta Louisa Maw.

== Bibliography ==
- Fletcher, Stella. Cardinal Wolsey: A Life in Renaissance Europe. Bloomsbury Academic, 2009.
