= James Bromley =

English mezzotint-engraver

James Bromley (1800–1838), was an English mezzotint-engraver.

Bromley was the third son of William Bromley, the line-engraver. Little is known respecting his life. Among his best plates may be enumerated portraits of the Duchess of Kent, after George Hayter; John, Earl Russell, after Hayter; and the Earl of Carlisle, when Lord Morpeth, after Thomas Heathfield Carrick; 'Falstaff,' after Henry Liverseege; and 'La Zingarella,' after Octavius Oakley. He exhibited twelve of his works at the Suffolk Street Gallery between 1829 and 1833. He died on 12 December 1838.
