= Dressing for the Carnival =

Painting by Winslow Homer

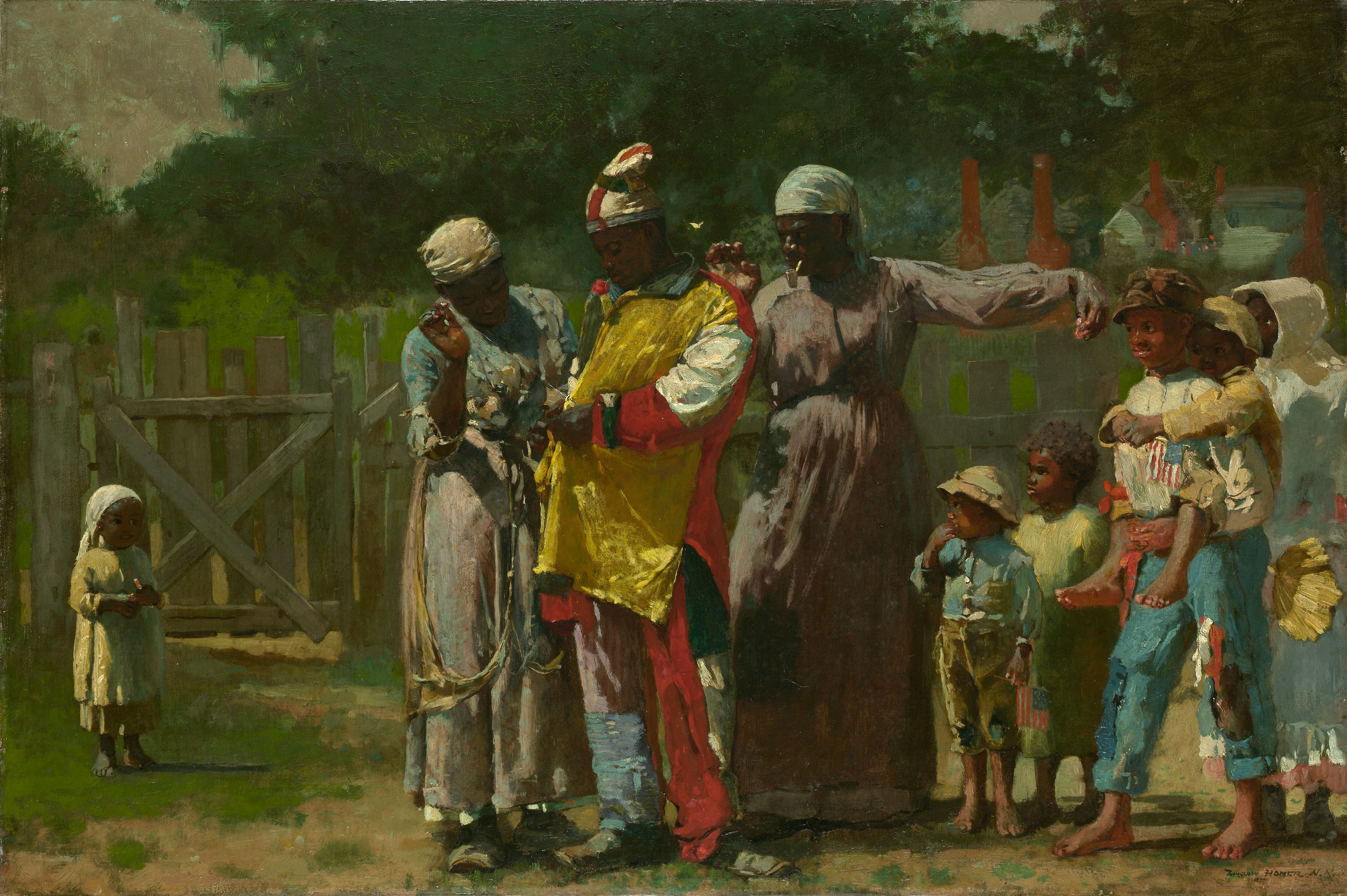
- Artist: Winslow Homer
- Year: 1877
- Medium: Oil on canvas
- Dimensions: 50.8 cm × 76.2 cm (20.0 in × 30.0 in)
- Location: Metropolitan Museum of Art, New York

Dressing for the Carnival is an oil on canvas painting by the American painter Winslow Homer, from 1877. It is held at the Metropolitan Museum of Art, in New York.

== Description ==
Homer painted African Americans, completely avoiding the stereotypes with which their collective image had been flooded during the period of Reconstruction after the American Civil War. The 1870s and 1880s produced innumerable images of African Americans at carnival time, mindless, jolly, condescending. But Homer's Dressing for the Carnival is unlike all of them: a deeply nuanced and, in the end, tragic scene of preparation for festivity. A group of people is preparing for the African-American festival known in the South as Jonkonnu and in the North as Pinkster. It entailed the costuming of a Harlequin-like figure or Lord of Misrule, and this Homer depicts: a man caparisoned in bright, tatterdemalion clothes, yellow, red, and blue, with a liberty cap on his head. Two women are sewing them on him. The one on the right extends her arm, pulling the long thread right through, in a gesture of compelling and somber gravity; she is a classical Fate, seen below the Mason–Dixon line. Next to her, but apart from her, gazing at the vesting ceremony with wonder, are some children, one of whom holds a Stars and Stripes (for by Reconstruction, the rituals of the Fourth of July had been overlaid on those of Jonkonnu). Homer makes us sense how far the hopes of emancipation still are from the realities of black life in the South.

== See also ==
- List of paintings by Winslow Homer
