= John Charles Bromley =

English engraver

- Born: 1795
- Died: 3 April 1839 (aged 43–44)
- Occupation: Engraver

John Charles Bromley (1795 – 3 April 1839) was an English mezzotint engraver.

== Biography ==
Bromley was born in 1795. He engraved the work of artists such as J. M. W. Turner and Thomas Girtin. He exhibited at the Royal Academy in 1827 and 1829. Bromley died on 3 April 1839 of "water on the chest".

His father William Bromley was an engraver, as was his brother James Bromley. His son, William Bromley III, was a painter. Another son, Frederick Bromley, was an engraver.
