= William Bromley (engraver) =

British engraver (1769–1842)

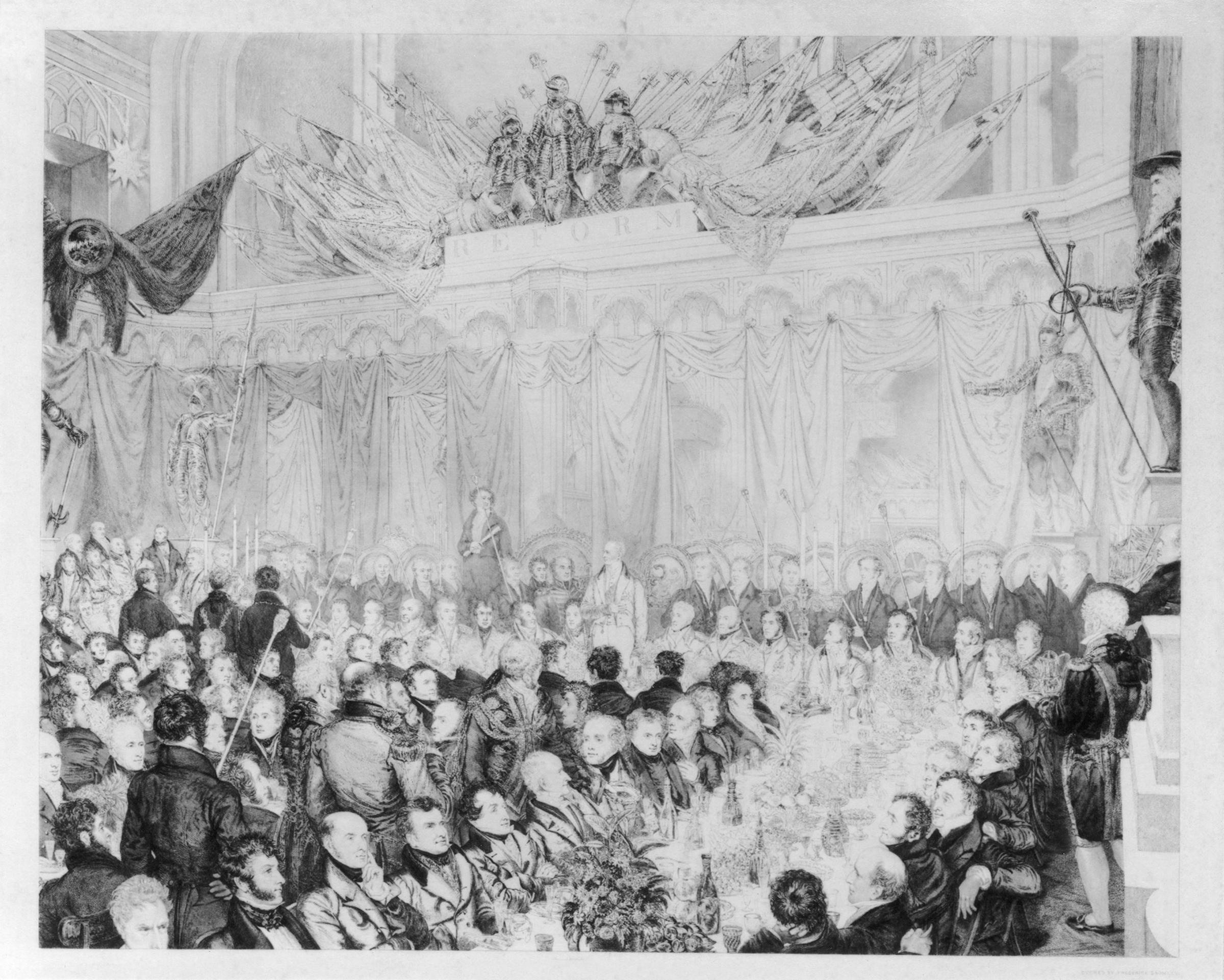
The Reform Banquet at Guildhall, 11 July 1832, now at the National Portrait Gallery; based on The Reform Banquet by Benjamin Robert Haydon

William Bromley (1769–1842) was a British engraver. Bromley, who was born at Carisbrooke on the Isle of Wight, was apprenticed to an engraver named J G Wooding in London, and soon attracted favorable notice.

Of his early works the most popular are the prints in 'Macklin's Bible,' and his engravings of Stothard's designs illustrating the 'History of England.' He engraved also two of Sir Thomas Lawrence's portraits of the Duke of Wellington, and one of the young Napoleon.

Bromley was elected an associate engraver of the Royal Academy in 1819, and was employed for many years by the trustees of the British Museum in engraving the Elgin Marbles after drawings by Henry Corbould (1787–1844).

His sons, John Charles Bromley and James Bromley, were also engravers. His grandson, William Bromley III, was a painter.
