= Prisoners from the Front =

1866 Winslow Homer painting

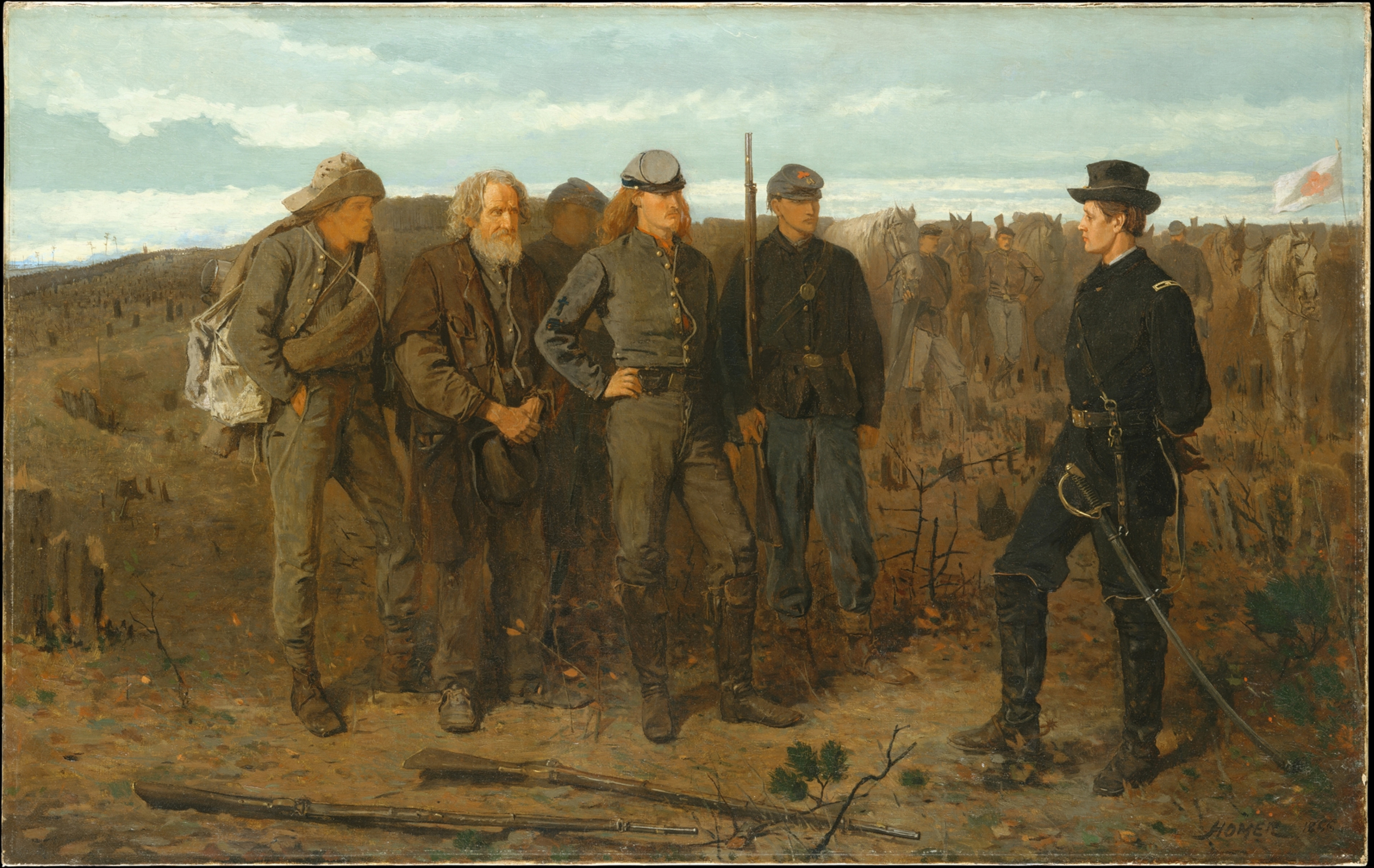
- Artist: Winslow Homer
- Year: 1866
- Medium: Oil on canvas
- Dimensions: 61 cm × 96.5 cm (24 in × 38.0 in)
- Location: Metropolitan Museum of Art; New York City
- Accession: 22.207

Prisoners from the Front is an 1866 painting by American artist Winslow Homer. One of Homer's most notable early works, the painting depicts a scene in which Confederate officers surrender to Union Brigadier General Francis Channing Barlow during the American Civil War. Homer's experience as a war correspondent likely contributed to his rendering of the work.

Citing Prisoners' style, tone, and provenance, American art critic Peter Schjeldahl once called Homer's work "The most telling of all paintings about the Civil War."

Infrared photography and numerous studies indicate that the painting underwent many changes in the course of completion.

== Description ==
The work depicts a group of Confederate soldiers surrendering to a Union officer in the barren landscape. The Union officer, identified as General Francis Channing Barlow, is recognizable, but the Confederate soldiers remain anonymous. Departing from traditional confrontation scenes where the vanquished bow down in submission, Homer introduces alterations. The Confederate prisoners, although indicating surrender by placing their rifles down, refuse to bow and stand in pride. Homer shows a group of Confederate soldiers of different ages. The elderly man positioned in the center of the group presents the most submissive demeanor among them. The young prisoner to his left has his hand in his pocket, showing confident nonchalance. The work captures a poignant portrayal of the tensions following the Civil War and the efforts to reconstruct the South.

== Interpretation ==
The painting perplexed critics, who struggled to categorize it according to conventional genres. It defies easy classification, combining elements of both historical and genre painting.

Many scholars see the work as a symbolic commentary on the entire American Civil War rather than a mere recording of a specific event. Frances Pohl argues that the painting, by minimizing the contrast between winner and loser, presents the war as "a renegotiation of terms" between North and South rather than a complete break between them. It illustrates a standoff that symbolizes the enduring animosity and bitterness harbored by the Confederates, as well as the Northerners' cluelessness as to the depths of that hostility. The painting suggests that the reconciliation between the North and South necessitates spiritual growth and maturity on both sides in the postwar era. Homer's focus on conveying the war's emotional impact sets this work apart, making it a significant piece of art in the context of Civil War representation.

Homer's grim landscape captures the ravages of war on the physical and mental aspects of the actual landscape, nature, and humanity. Art historians note that Homer achieves the effect by skillfully integrating elements of history painting, landscape painting, and photography in his artwork.

== Influences ==
Homer skillfully navigated the complexities of depicting the conflict in a historical context. The painting's meaning evolved over time, emphasizing themes of brotherly feeling and humanity, and erasing the strictly sectarian interpretation. Prisoners from the Front continues to be regarded as an example of historical art that thrives on ambiguity, conveying conflicting messages about the Civil War as a tragic, fratricidal event. The painting is both featured and referenced in the film Gettysburg, with it appearing in the opening credits and being mirrored in a scene where Lieutenant Thomas Chamberlain speaks to three Confederate prisoners.

== See also ==
- List of paintings by Winslow Homer
