= H. Thomas Bromley =

English artist

Henry Thomas Bromley, RBSA (1853–1924), known generally as H. Thomas Bromley, was an artist born in Birmingham, England who did most of his work in the region around Birmingham. His reputation is noted in Davenport's Registry of Artists.

Bromley was a member of the elite Royal Birmingham Society of Artists. The society was formed in 1820 and given royal status by Queen Victoria. Bromley exhibited 14 works at the society from 1881 to 1888 of rural and coastal scenes and animals.

His works are held in various museums including the Fogg Art Museum at Harvard University, Cambridge, MA. His works are also found in private collections including the Allen Autry, Sr. Family Collection.

His works have been sold through various prominent auction houses including the following examples:

- “Morning” (1893) Biddle and Webb, sold 5 May 2000
- “October Glow on Avon” (1891) Sotheby's, sold 6 September 1994
- “Pigeons on a hook, a trompe l'oeil” (1877) Christie's, South Kensington, year 1877, sold 22 November 2005
- “The Old Plough Horse in a Stable”, signed & dated 1882 Hampshire Auctions
- “The Shoeing” Oil on Canvas (1914) inscribed on canvas and frame. H.THOMAS BROMLEY 1914 Carousel Antiques & Gallery Auction. Sold 17 February 2008
- "On the Dovedale" signed and dated 1891 Ross's, Belfast, sold 8 April 2025
