= Mock election =

Unofficial or advisory non-binding election

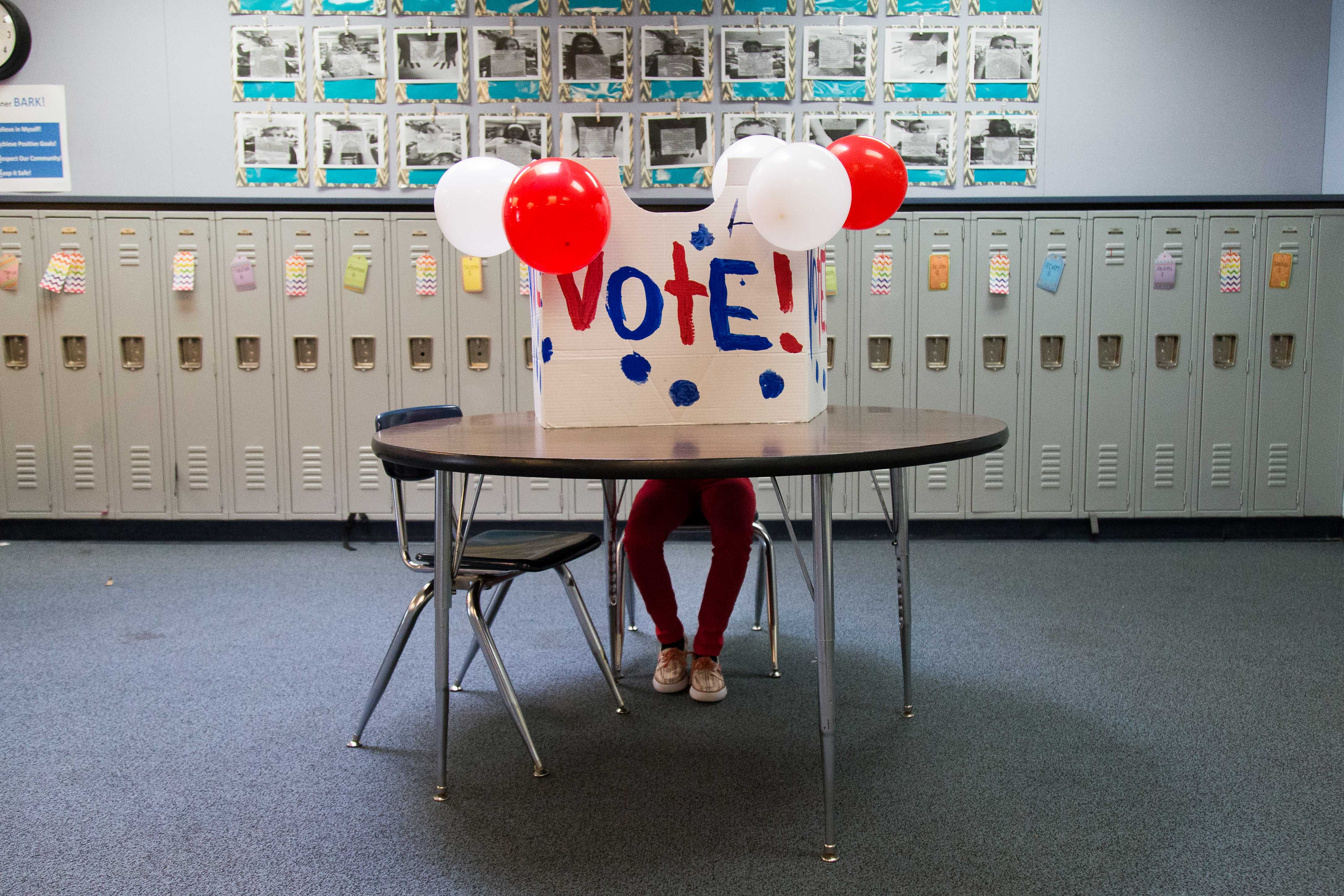
A mock voting booth at a US elementary school

A mock election is an election for educational demonstration, amusement, or political protest reasons to call for free and fair elections. Less precisely it can refer to a real election purely for advisory (essentially without power) committees or forums such as some student councils, particularly those that chiefly emulate a real legislative body.

== For educational purposes ==
Schools sometimes organize mock elections to introduce young people to the concept of elections before they have reached their voting age. The elections aim to give the participants an understanding of democracy and politics, and encourage future young voters to cast a ballot. Mock elections are frequently held during an actual election. They can have real or fake candidates depending on the school and the purpose of the mock election.

== For a change to democratic elections ==
As a way to introduce democratic elections in Bhutan, in preparation for the Bhutanese general election in 2008, two mock elections were held. The mock elections were primarily used to familiarize voters with the procedural aspects of voting, including registration, Voter Photo Identity Cards, using a voting machine, and vote counting. The first election was held in 2006 at Paro College of Education, and featured faculty and students who formed or voted for six dummy political parties. The parties engaged in political campaigning, which cumulated in two elections, the first resulting in two main parties, and the second deciding a winner. The second mock election was held country-wide on April 21, 2007 with four dummy parties. After the first round, the top two parties advanced to the second round, which was held on May 28, 2007.

== For amusement and parody ==
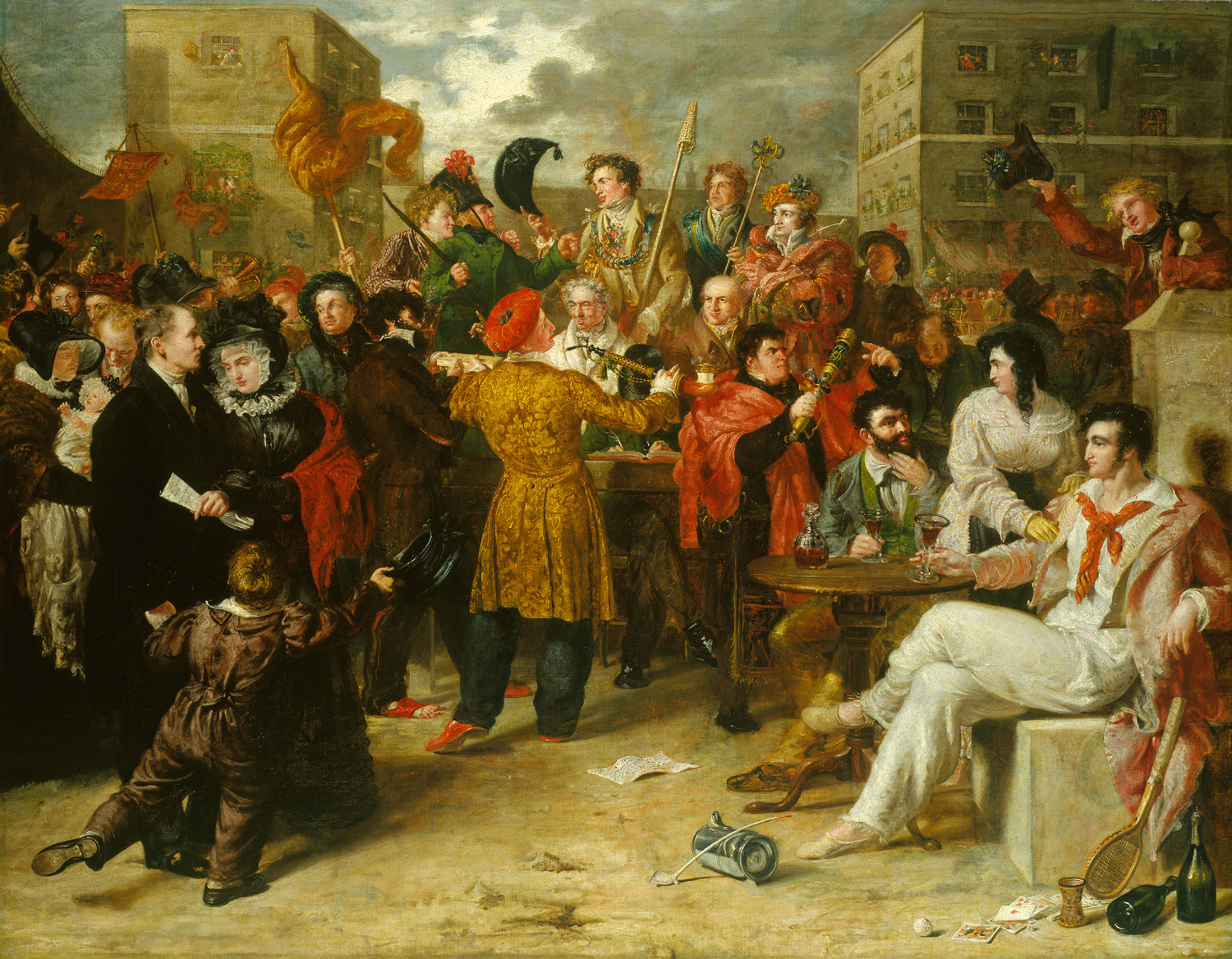
The Mock Election by Benjamin Robert Haydon, depicting a mock election in a British debtors prison, 1827.

In the United Kingdom, a mock election was held in the grounds of a debtors' prison, King's Bench Prison, in 1827. The prisoners declared they would elect two Members of Parliament (the standard representation for a pre-Reform Act English Borough). The constituency was dubbed the "Borough of Tenterden" after the Lord Chief Justice of the King's Bench Lord Tenterden. Three candidates stood for election. One of them, Robert Stanton, had recently been a real Member of Parliament. Another was the boxer Henry Josiah Holt, and the third was Joseph Meredith. The election was presided over by an Irishman Jonas Murphy, posing as the Lord High Sheriff. Notably, artist Benjamin Robert Haydon was imprisoned there during the election and was inspired to create a painting based on the events, titled The Mock Election.

== See also ==
- Garrat Elections – 18th century mock elections in England
- Humours of an Election, a series of four oil paintings and later engravings by William Hogarth that illustrate, creatively, the election of a member of parliament in Oxfordshire in 1754.
- Mock election in the King's Bench Prison
- Mock trial
- Model Congress
- Model United Nations
