= Robert Stanton (merchant) =

British businessman, looking-glass maker and banker

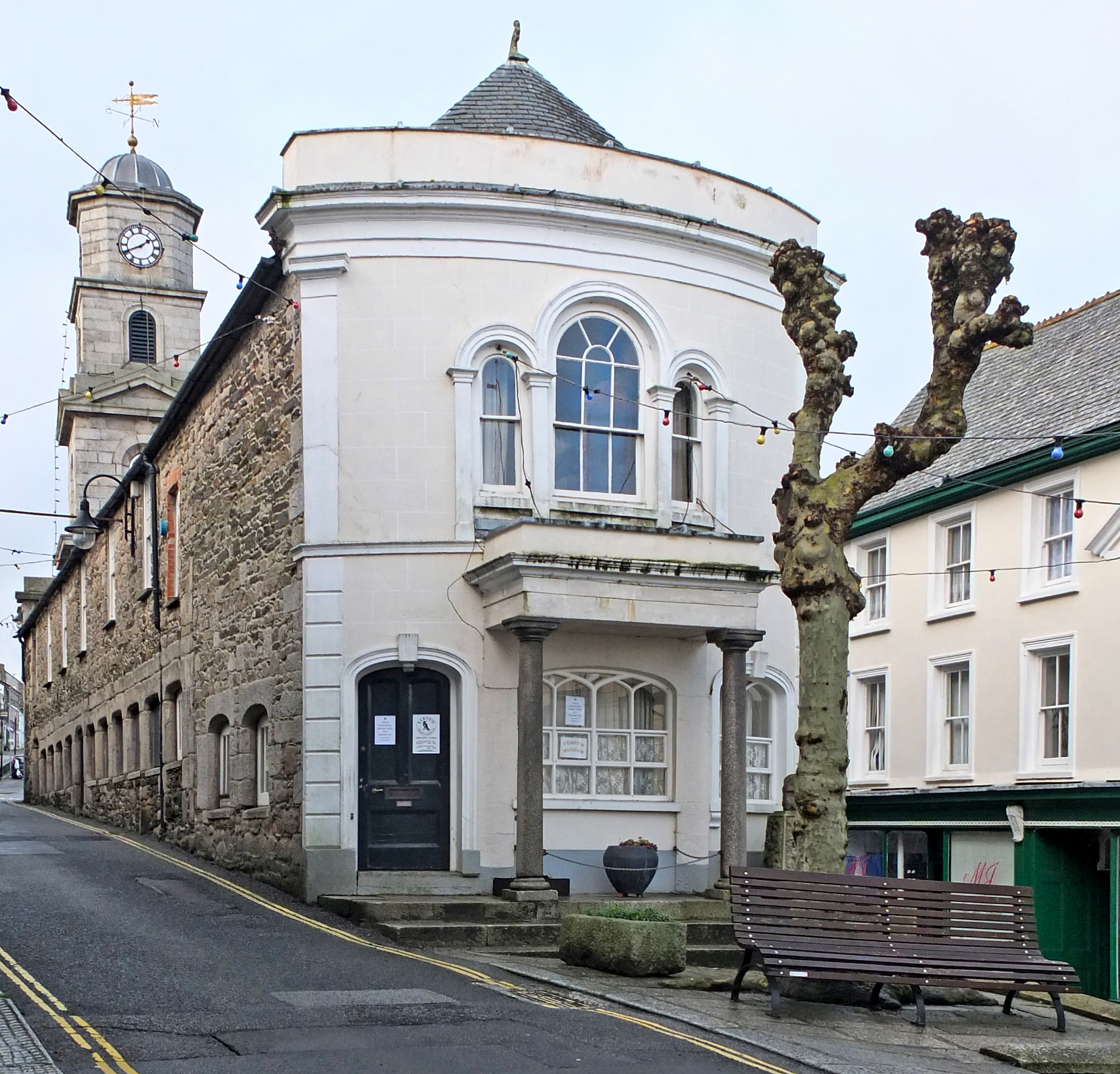
The Town Hall in Penryn, the scene of Stanton's election win

Robert Stanton (4 January 1793 – 3 May 1833) was a British businessman, a looking-glass maker and banker who served for two years as a Tory Member of Parliament for the former English parliamentary constituency of Penryn in Cornwall.

After failing as a banker he did not stand again for Parliament. In 1827 he was committed to King's Bench Prison for debt, and was released before he died.

== Early life ==
Born in 1793, Stanton was the eldest son of Robert Stanton, a looking-glass manufacturer, of Islington Green and Lombard Street. His mother was Eleanor, a daughter of John Mason, originally from Spilsby.

By 1794, Stanton's father was in business making looking-glasses in Lombard Street, until about 1815 with a partner called Wilcoxon, and later as a partner in a firm called "Wilcoxon, Stanton and Co." Stanton's mother died in 1809, leaving nine children.

In 1818, Stanton's father died at Plymouth and was buried at Bunhill Fields. His estate was sworn to be worth under £80,000. In a will dated 1809, and a codicil dated 1811, he left his daughters £5,000 each. To his son Robert, he left £1,000 when he reached the age of twenty-one, his Islington Green house, and his business. To his son Charles he also left £1,000, and the two brothers were to have an equal share in the residue of their father's estate when they were both aged thirty.

In the event, Charles Stanton had died in 1811, aged ten, so Stanton came into the whole residue of his father's estate in 1823.

== Marriage ==
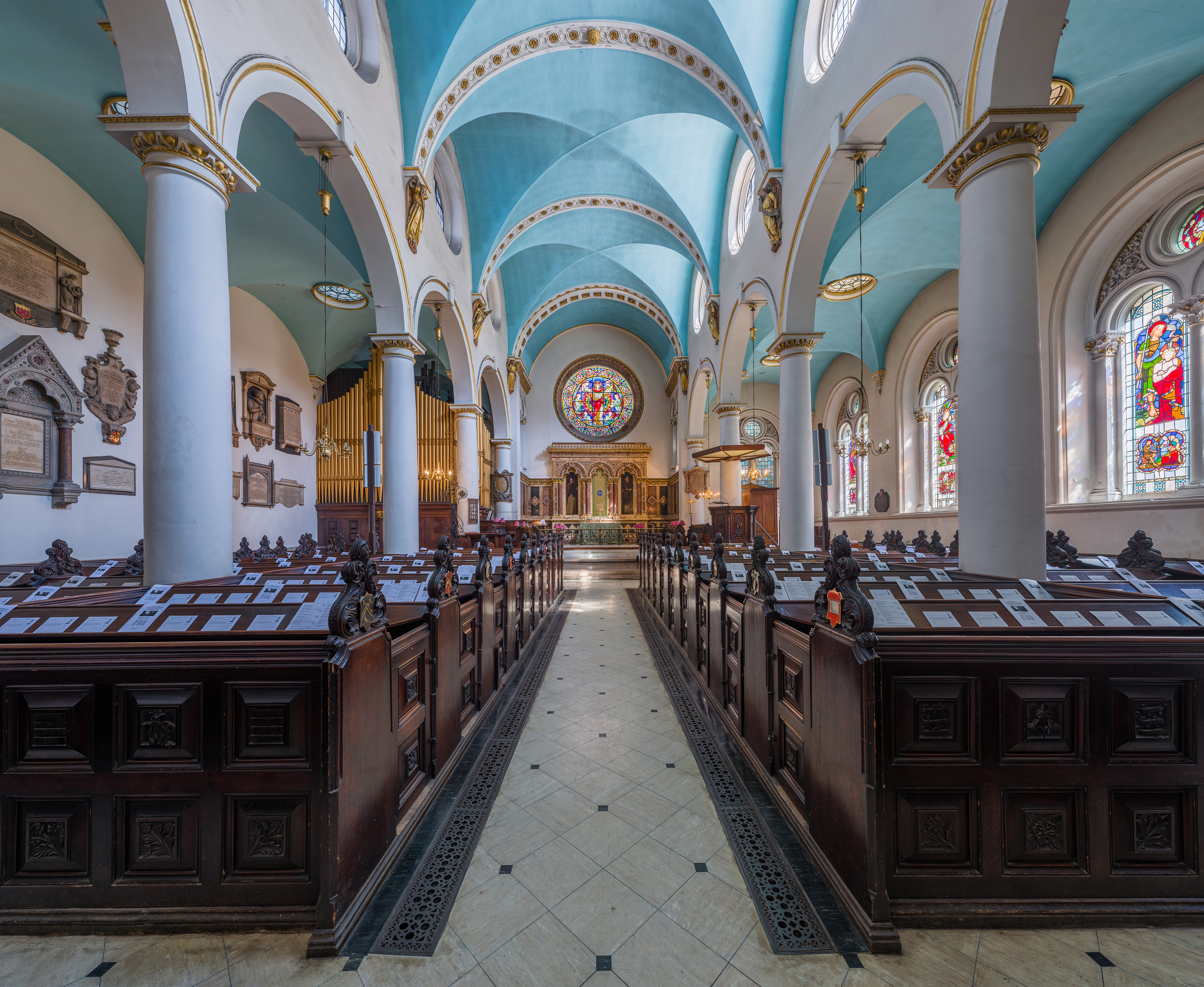
St Michael, Cornhill

On 21 March 1816, Stanton married Louisa Sarah Ann Darby of St Michael, Cornhill, in the City of London, a daughter of Thomas Darby, and they had two sons and at least four daughters. He was recorded as a merchant when his first child, Louisa, was baptized in 1817, and his address was then in City Road. A son, Robert, died in December 1817, aged two weeks. Stanton later had another son named Robert, who was still alive in 1822. When his daughters Eleanor Darby (1822) and Sophia Frances (1823) were baptized, Stanton was living in Highbury Place and was described as a gentleman. His daughter Marianne Maria died at the age of three in April 1833.

== Career ==
Before coming into his inheritance, Stanton seems to have carried on his father's business for some time, and in 1828 he said he had been in the business of making looking-glasses for about five years. However, by 1820 the firm's name had become "Wilcoxon, Harding and Owen", so he may have sold out by then.

Sir Christopher Hawkins later gave evidence that in about 1822 a man named Simpson had introduced Stanton to him as someone who had inherited a lot of money and wanted to be a Member of Parliament. At the time, Hawkins could not help, but in 1824 he advised Stanton to try his luck for Penryn in Cornwall. Hawkins had himself been a member in this borough until 1824, and a vacancy had now arisen there due to the death of one of the sitting members, Henry Swann.

In the ensuing by-election campaign, the press in Cornwall described Stanton as a banker from London, and according to his own later evidence he had embarked on that career a few months before. Standing as a Tory, he found himself up against a local candidate supported by the corporation of the borough. Polling went on for three days, 300 votes were cast, and Stanton won by six votes, 153 to 147. The election cost him between £2,000 and £3,000, on credit, and none of this had been paid to his creditors by 1826.

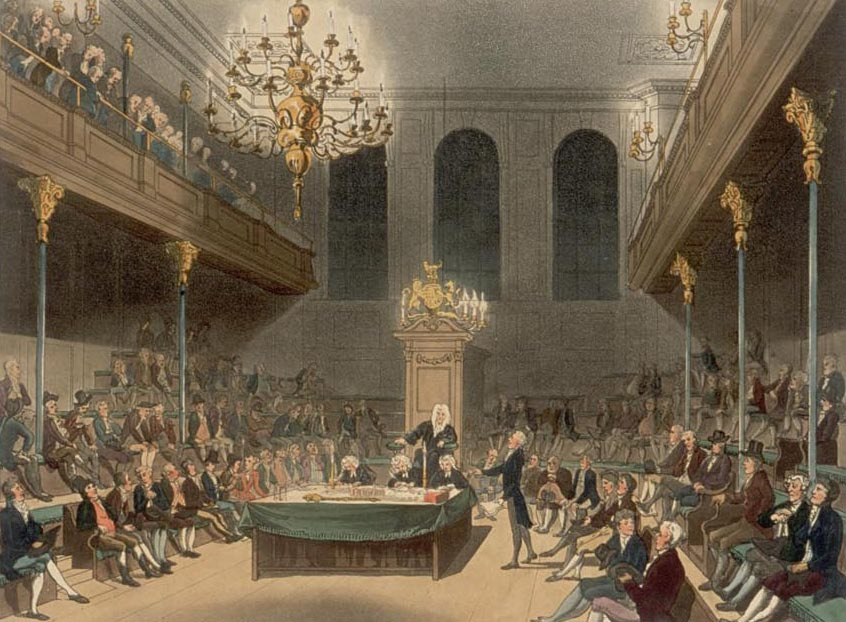
The House of Commons

The House of Commons has no record of Stanton speaking in debates, but he voted against Catholic emancipation on 1 March 21 April, and 10 May 1825.

By 1826, Stanton was in trouble, with large debts. Two months after he was elected to parliament, his banking business had collapsed, and trustees were appointed who paid his creditors ten shillings in the pound. Early in 1826, he was thinking of leaving the House of Commons by "taking the Chiltern Hundreds", but there was soon a general election, and he did not stand again.

== Debtors' prison ==
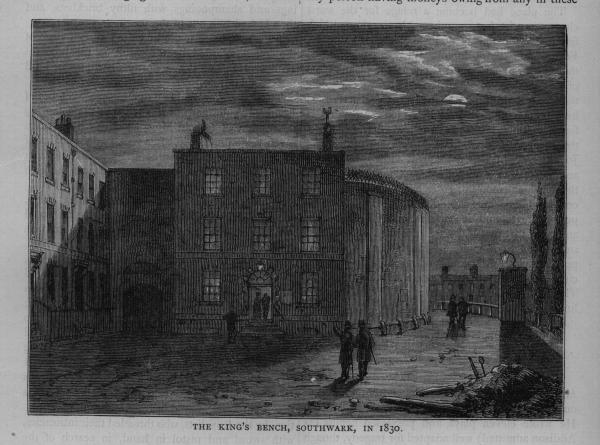
The King's Bench Prison in 1830

On 6 February 1827, Stanton was arrested on an action for a debt of £900 owed to a bank in Falmouth, money lent to him at the outset of his election campaign. On 10 February he was committed to the King's Bench Prison, but he was released on 20 February, having compromised to settle the debt at fourteen shillings in the pound.

On 22 June 1827, Stanton faced another king's bench action, this time for £75 owed to Edward Jones, and he was imprisoned until 27 August. During this second period in the gaol, a mock election took place there, from 12 to 16 July 1827. Stanton took part in it, and it was reported that he had "particularly distinguished himself in the frolic, and appeared on each of the days dressed up in the most grotesque manner imaginable". On the final day of the election, the marshal of the prison sent in troops, in the hope of preventing a chairing, and some men, including Stanton, found themselves in "close confinement".

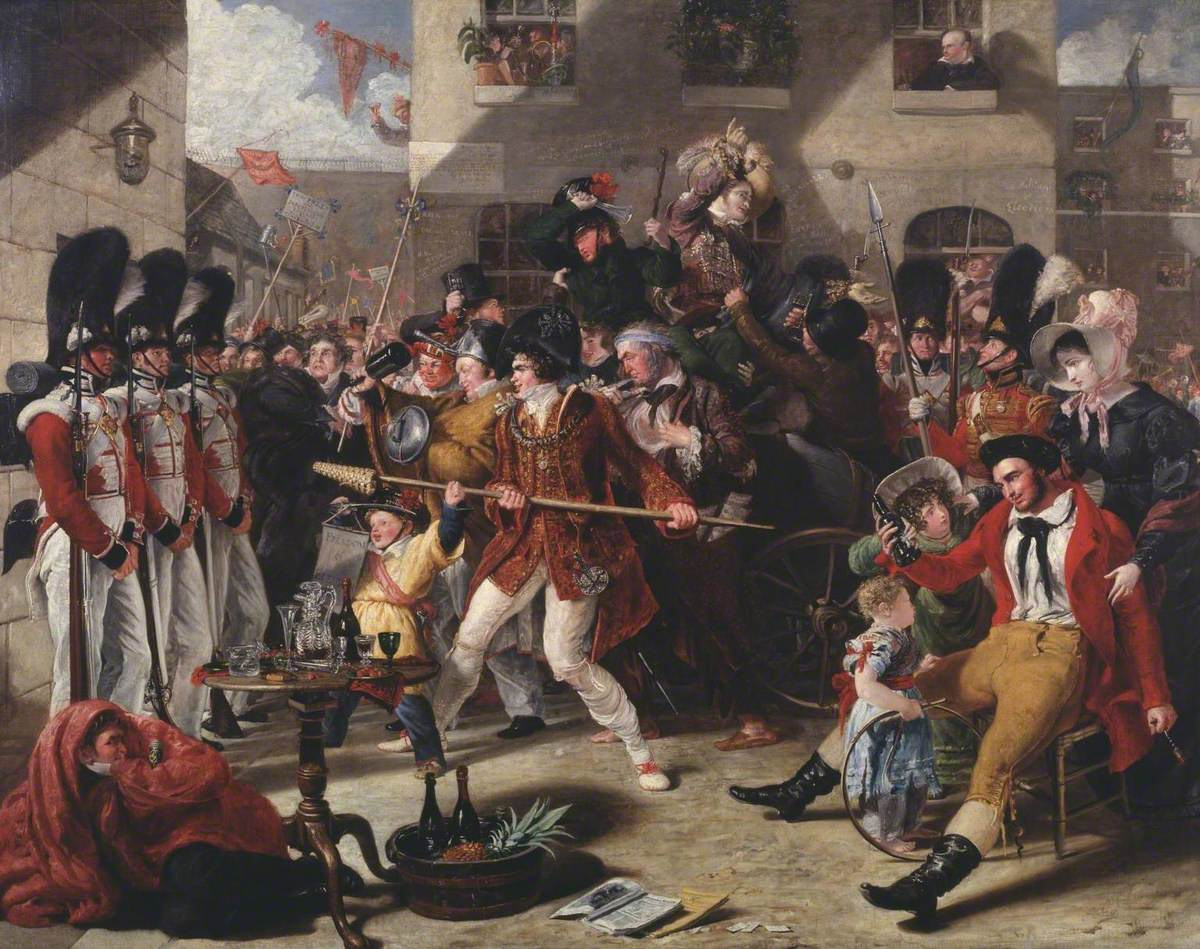
Benjamin Robert Haydon, Chairing the Member, 1828

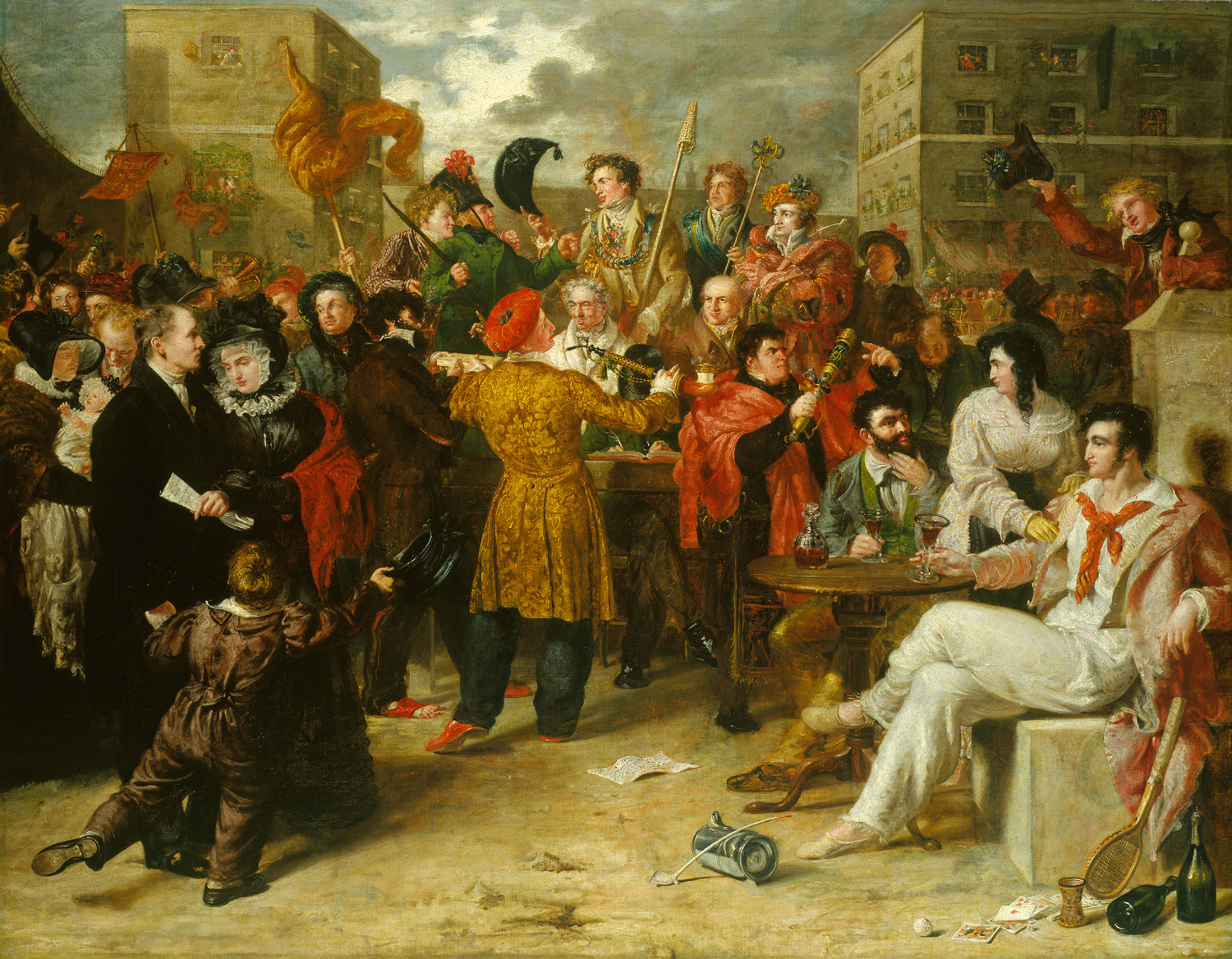
Benjamin Robert Haydon, The Mock Election, 1827.

The painter Benjamin Robert Haydon was himself in the prison for debt at the time and later painted two canvases to mark the occasion, Chairing the Member and The Mock Election. Stanton appears in the second, "attired in the quilt of his bed, and in a yellow turban... pointing, without looking at his opponent, with a sneer". Wearing a blue rosette on his turban, Stanton was one of three candidates, the others being the "Lord Mayor of King's Gate Prison", with a yellow and blue rosette, and an Irishman, Joseph Meredith, wearing a red rosette, who is being instructed in the art of boxing by Henry Hold, a well-known pugilist.

Nothing is recorded of Stanton's life after 1828, when he was called to the House of Lords to give evidence on a bill to disfranchise Penryn, when his replies, particularly on his relationship with Hawkins, were found to be evasive. He denied the suggestion that Hawkins had lent him £1,000, stating that no such claim on him had been made, and also denied allegations that he had taken part in election bribery. He said almost all of his expenses had gone on food and drink.

== Death ==
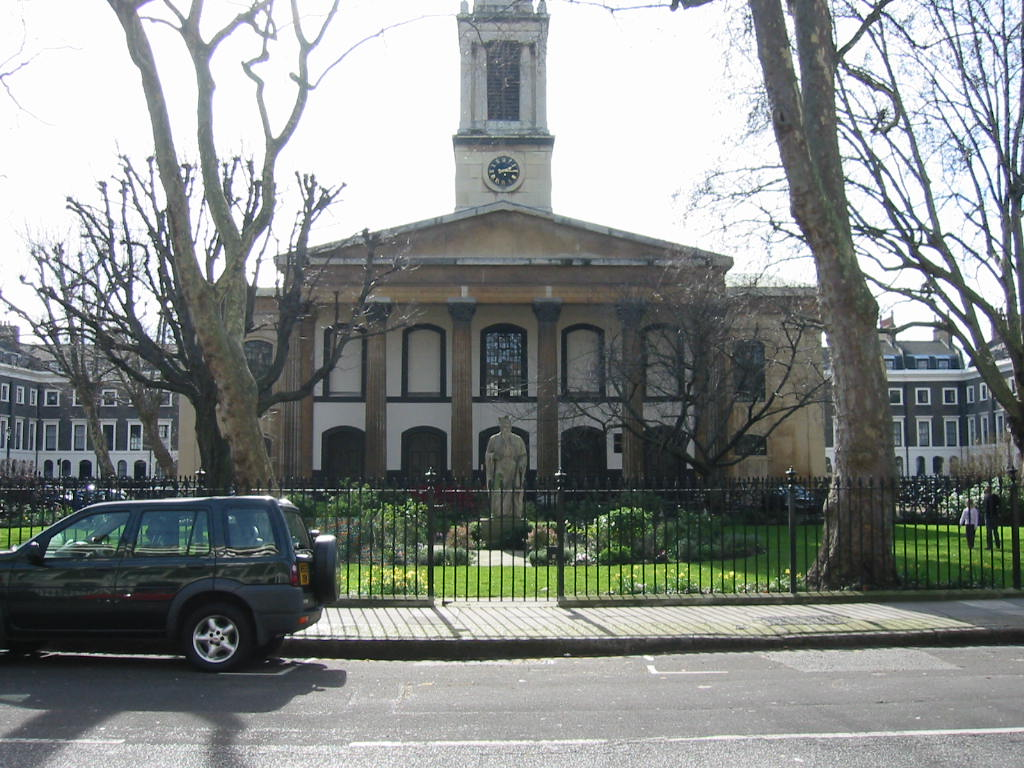
Trinity Square, Southwark

After release from prison, Stanton went to live in Trinity Square, Southwark, and died there in May 1833. His daughter Eleanor died in 1835, and both were buried in Bunhill Fields.

By his will, which mentions no business interests, Stanton left his son Robert a house in Fenchurch Street, and his life insurance policies worth £3,000 to his daughters. He left £500 to his wife and two smaller bequests of £50 each to Maria Jane Ashmole, her cousin, and Robert Stanton Wise, his nephew. His wife had a life interest in the residue, to go to his children. His executors included his brother-in-law William Harding, but they renounced their position.

Benjamin Robert Haydon later outlined Stanton’s life as follows:

Staunton [sic] died in a mad house. He became, after spending £80,000, a clerk to Charles Pearson, saved money, became mad and died.

== Notes ==
Parliament of the United Kingdom
Preceded by Pascoe Grenfell; Henry Swann	Member of Parliament for Penryn; 1824–1826; With: Pascoe Grenfell 1824–1826	Succeeded by David Barclay; William Manning
