= Fake election =

Fake election may refer to:

- A mock election, held for educational purposes or for parody purposes
- An election with a high degree of electoral fraud
