= Edward Chatfield =

English painter

Edward Chatfield (1802 – 22 January 1839, in London) was an English portrait painter who also painted some historical subjects.

== Life ==
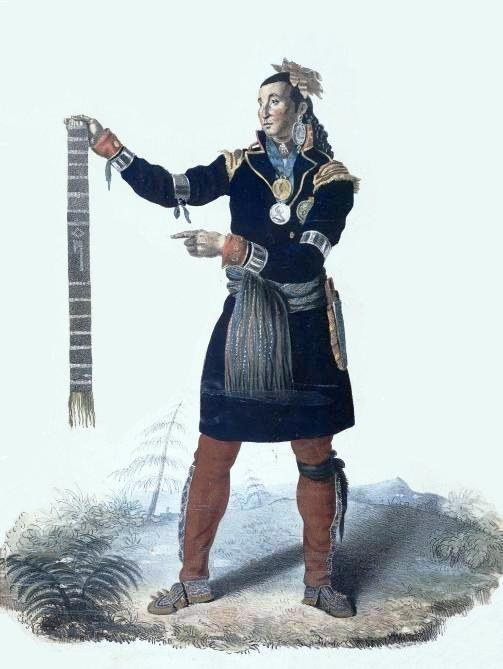
A lithograph by Charles Hullmandel, after Chatfield's portrait of the Huron chief Nicolas Vincent Tsawenhohi (1825)

He was the only surviving son of John Chatfield, a distiller from Croydon, and his wife, Anne Humfrey. Through James Elmes, the editor of Annals of the Fine Arts, he obtained an introduction to Benjamin Robert Haydon, who accepted him as a pupil. In Haydon's studio he went through a full course of practical anatomy, and made a close study of two of Haydon's particular enthusiasms, the Elgin Marbles and the works of Raphael, especially the Raphael Cartoons.

His first exhibited picture was the Death of Moses, shown at the British Institution, in the spring of 1823. The reviewer in the European Magazine said the picture was "on large scale, but a physiognomist would certainly conclude from the face of Moses that he did not possess all those mental qualities mentioned of him in Scripture."

Among his portrait subjects were a group Huron chiefs, who visited London in 1825. Lithographs of the paintings were made by Charles Hullmandel. His painting of the Campbells of Islay on an otter hunt, was shown at the Royal Academy in 1834.

He exhibited at the Royal Academy between 1827 and 1838, showing, in addition to some portraits, the Death of Locke in 1833, the Battle of Killiecrankie in 1836, and Ophelia in 1837. He wrote some articles for Blackwood's Magazine, and the New Monthly Magazine, under the pseudonym "Echion".

He died at 66 Judd Street, Brunswick Square, where he had lived with the wood-engraver John Orrin Smith and Orrin Smith's family for some years, on 22 January 1839.

== Sources ==
- Cust, Lionel Henry (1887). "Chatfield, Edward" . In Stephen, Leslie (ed.). Dictionary of National Biography. Vol. 10. London: Smith, Elder & Co.
