= The Mock Election =

1827 painting by Benjamin Robert Haydon

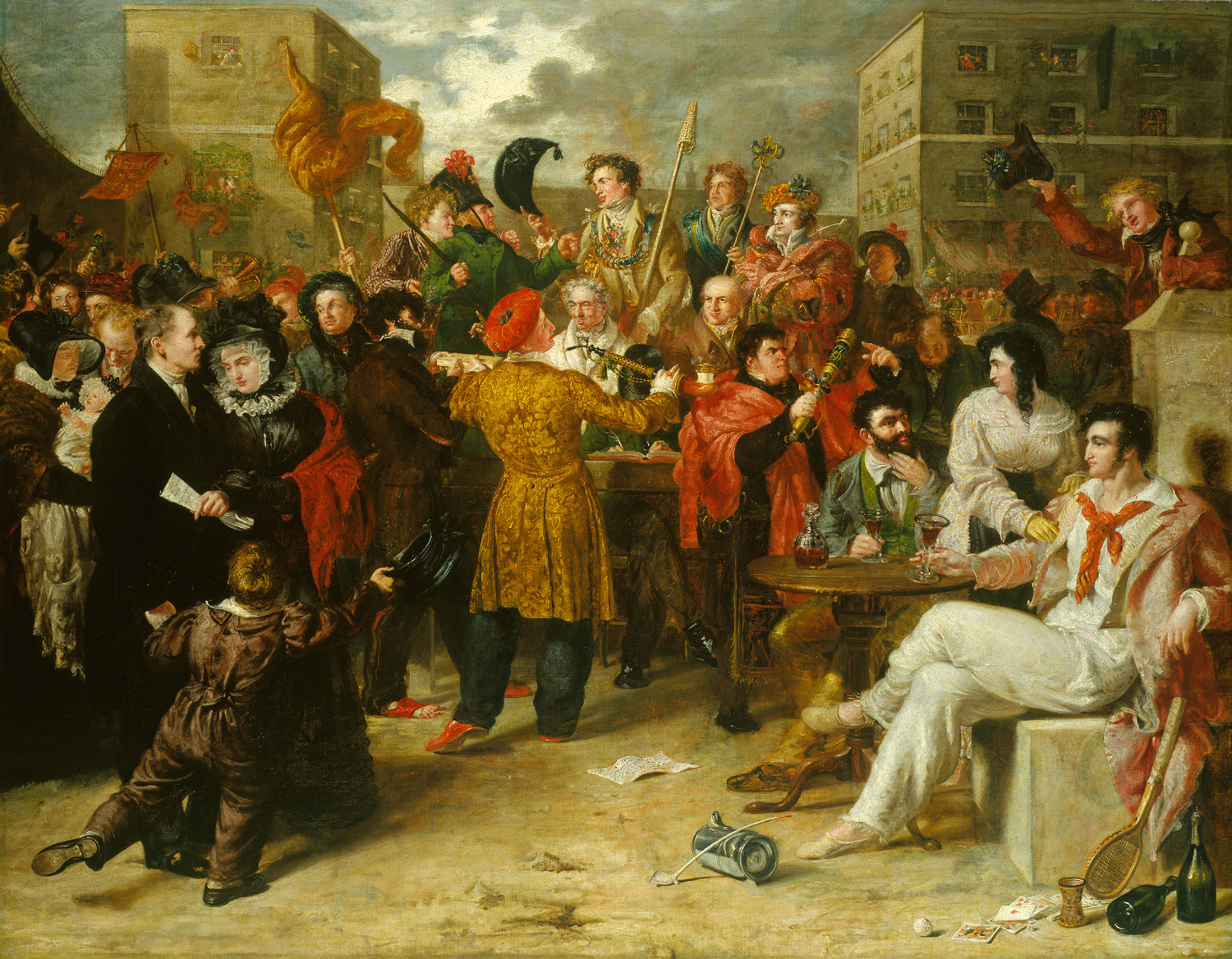
- Artist: Benjamin Robert Haydon
- Year: 1827
- Type: Oil on canvas, genre painting
- Dimensions: 140 cm × 190 cm (57 in × 73 in)
- Location: Royal Collection, London

The Mock Election is an oil on canvas genre painting by the British artist Benjamin Robert Haydon, from 1827.

== History and description ==
It was inspired by a real-life event that took place while Haydon was himself imprisoned at the King's Bench Prison in Southwark for debt.

The conditions at the prison were fairly lenient for the inmates while they attempted to clear their debts. As a joke, several of the prisoners decided to organise an election, imitating those of a British general election. They declared they would elect two Members of Parliament (the standard representation for a pre-Reform Act English Borough). The constituency was dubbed the "Borough of Tenterden" after the Lord Chief Justice of the King's Bench Lord Tenterden. Three candidates stood for election, one of them Robert Stanton had recently been a real Member of Parliament. Another was the boxer Henry Josiah Holt. The election was presided over by an Irishman, Jonas Murphy, posing as the Lord High Sheriff.

The painting was acquired by George IV for 500 guineas and remains in the Royal Collection. It was followed by a sequel Chairing the Member, depicting the aftermath of the mock election and the calling in of soldiers by the prison authorities to restore order.

== Bibliography ==
- Dart, Gregory. Metropolitan Art and Literature, 1810-1840: Cockney Adventures. Cambridge University Press, 2012.
- O'Keeffe, Paul. A Genius for Failure: The life of Benjamin Robert Haydon. Random House, 2011.
