= Chairing the Member (Haydon) =

Painting by Benjamin Robert Haydon

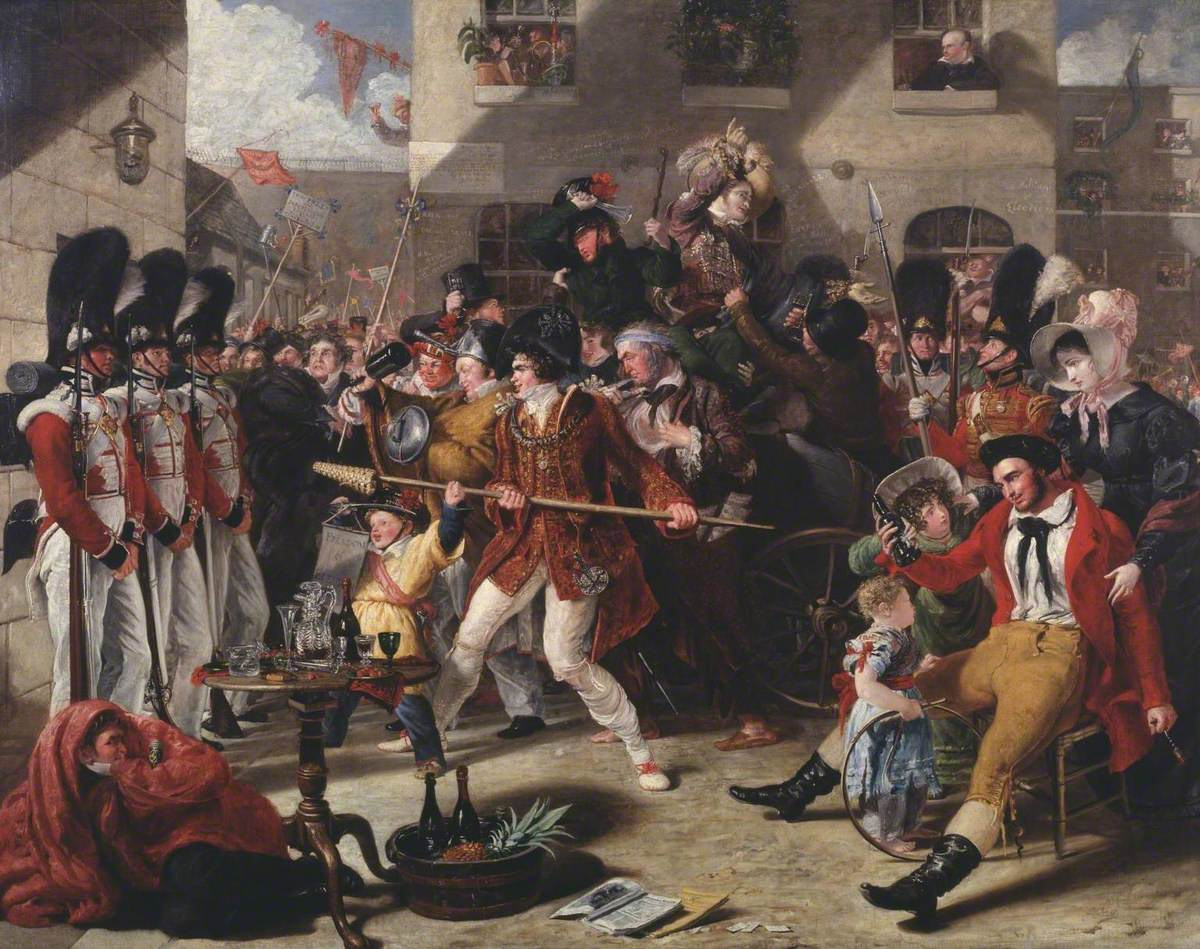
- Artist: Benjamin Robert Haydon
- Year: 1828
- Type: Oil on canvas, genre painting
- Dimensions: 191.8 cm × 152.4 cm (75.5 in × 60.0 in)
- Location: Tate Britain; London

Chairing the Member is an 1828 oil painting by the British artist Benjamin Robert Haydon. Combining elements of genre painting and history painting, it was inspired by an event he has witnessed while imprisoned in the King's Bench Prison for debt. The prisoners staged a mock election in which two of them were "elected" as Members of Parliament.

Haydon had portrayed the actual voting taking place in his 1827 work The Mock Election. For the second, companion painting he focused on the ceremonial chairing of the winners. It was not an accurate depiction of the scene. By the time the military arrived to restore order in the prison (represented by the file of Grenadier Guards on the left) the candidates had already been confined in a strongroom. Haydon is himself seen watching the events from an upstairs window.

The painting was completed by the end of August 1828 and in October went on display at the Western Exchange Bazaar in the fashionable shopping district off Regent's Street along with several of Haydon's other paintings including Venus Appearing to Anchises. It received praise from a reviewer in The Times.

While The Mock Election had been bought by George IV for the Royal Collection, he did not purchase the follow-up painting. Instead it was bought at a lower price of £300 by a man from Haydon's native Devon. It is now in the collection of the Tate Britain in Pimlico, having been acquired in 1946. Haydon never completed a planned third painting of the series The Election Ball.

== See also ==
- Chairing the Member, a 1755 painting by William Hogarth

== Bibliography ==
- Dart, Gregory. Metropolitan Art and Literature, 1810-1840: Cockney Adventures. Cambridge University Press, 2012.
- Finn, Margot C. The Character of Credit: Personal Debt in English Culture, 1740-1914. Cambridge University Press, 2003.
- O'Keeffe, Paul. A Genius for Failure: The life of Benjamin Robert Haydon. Random House, 2011.
