= Mock election in the King's Bench Prison =

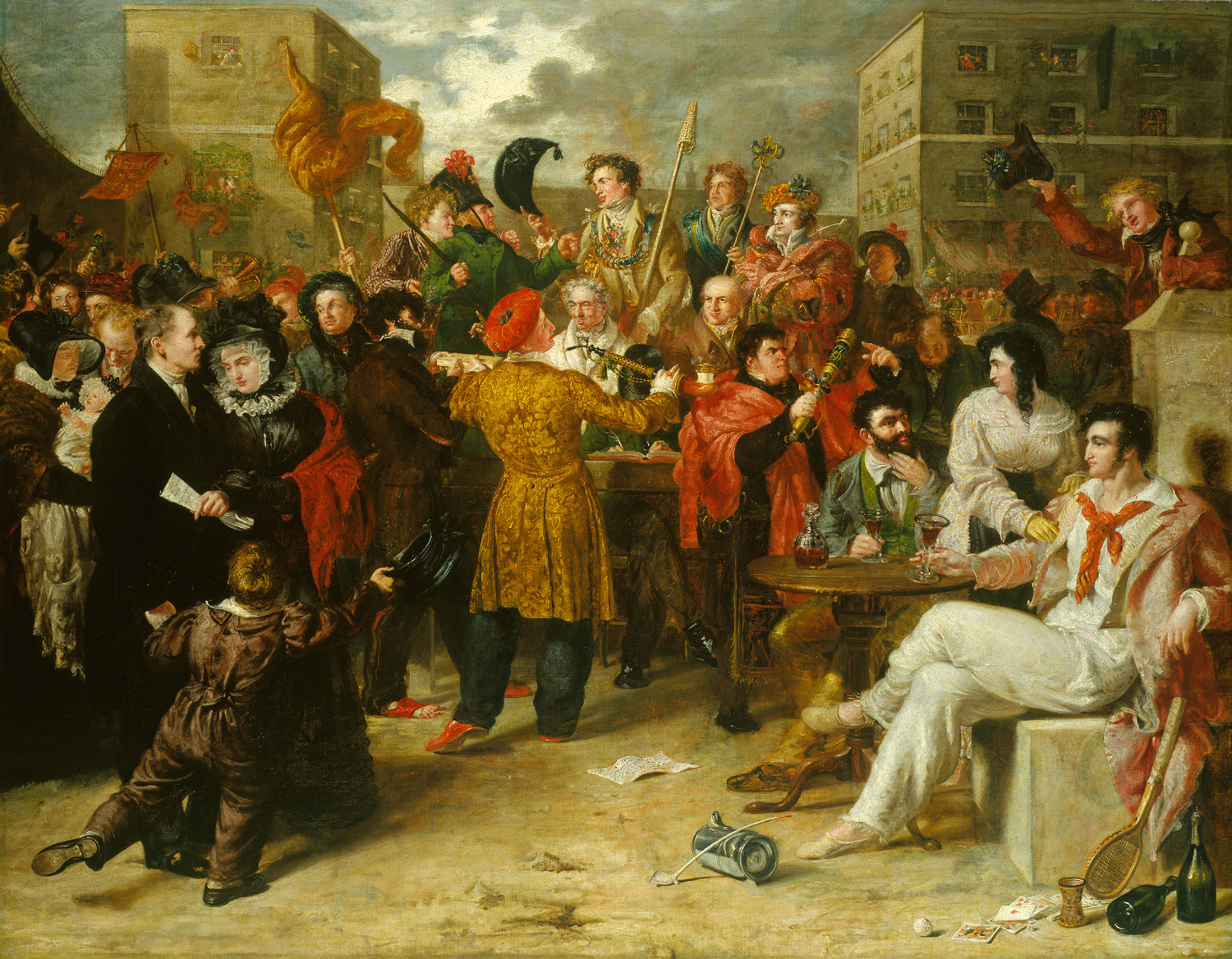
The Mock Election, as painted by Benjamin Haydon

In July 1827, the inmates of the King's Bench Prison, a debtors' prison, in Borough, South London, devised an amusement to pass the time which gained the attention of the general public. It was proposed that they should elect a member to represent "Tenterden" (a slang name for the prison) in Parliament. Three candidates were put up, one of whom was Lieutenant Meredith, an eccentric naval officer.

... As I approached the unfortunate, but merry, crowd, to the last day of my life I shall ever remember the impression... baronets and bankers, authors and merchants, painters and poets... dandies of no rank in rap and tat-ters... all mingled in indiscriminate merriment, with a spiked wall, twenty feet high, above their heads...

— Benjamin Haydon.

All the characteristics of a regular election were parodied. Addresses from the candidates to the 'worthy and independent electors' were printed and posted up around the prison; contending parties wrote broadsheets and sang songs attacking their opponents; there were processions with flags and music, to take the several candidates to visit the several "Collegians" (i. e., prisoners) in their rooms; speeches were made in the courtyards, full of grotesque humour; a pseudo "high-sheriff" and other "election officers" were chosen to oversee the proceedings "properly"; and the electors were invited to "rush to the poll" early on Monday morning, the 16th of July.

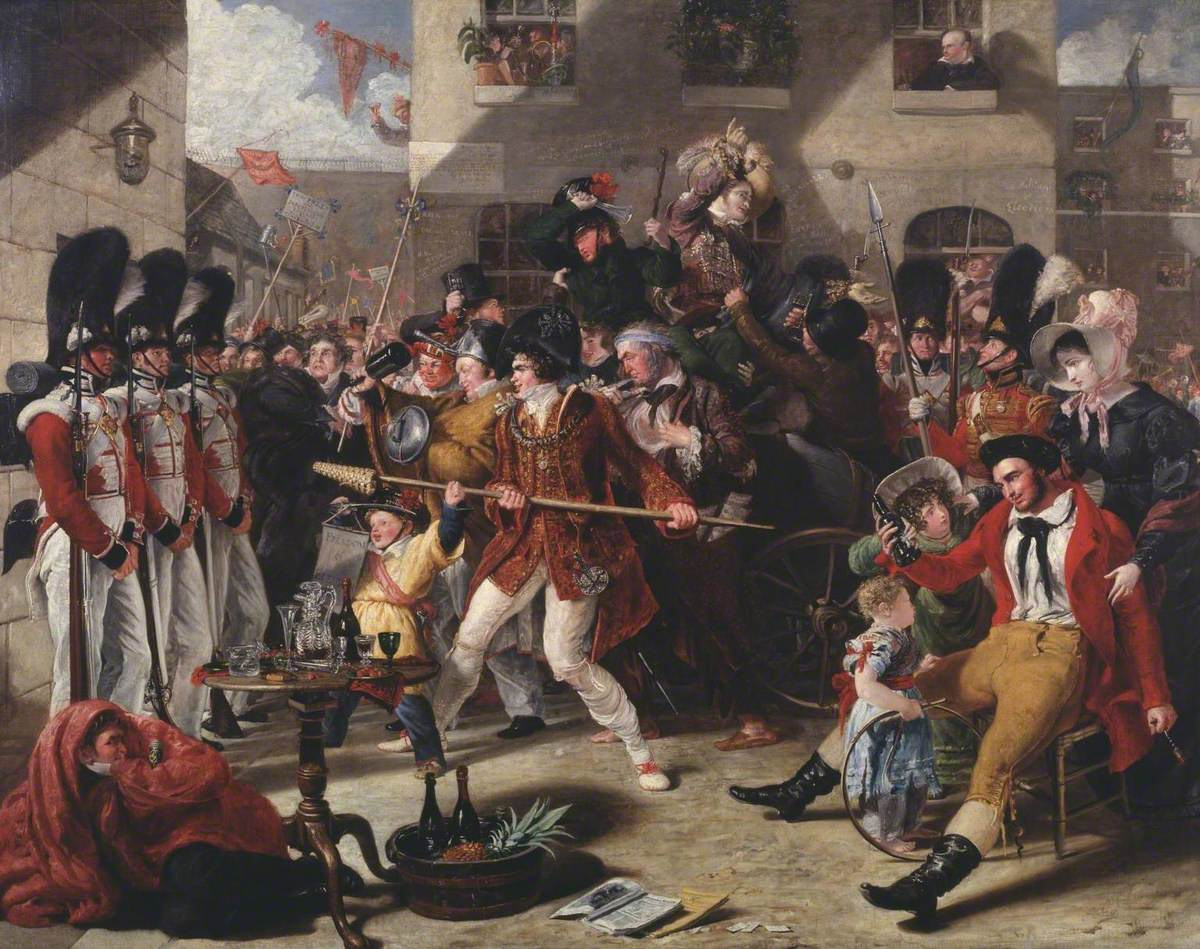
Chairing the Member by Haydon, 1828

The turnkeys (guards) of the prison entered into the fun. While these preliminary plans were engaging attention, a creditor happened to enter the prison; and seeing the prisoners so exceedingly joyous, declared that such a kind of imprisonment for debt could be no punishment; and he therefore liberated his debtor. Whether owing to this singular result of prison-discipline (or indiscipline), or an apprehension of evils that might follow, Mr. Jones, marshal of the prison, put a stop to the whole proceedings on the morning of the 16th. Apparently the proceedings were halted violently, exasperating the prisoners. They resented the language used towards them, and opposed the treatment to which they were subjected; until a squad of Foot-guards, with fixed bayonets, forcibly drove some of the leaders into a filthy "black-hole" or place of confinement.

The three candidates, and other persons who were active in the election, were for some time kept in close confinement, and a sergeant's guard was introduced, and remained in the prison all night. The result was pacific; but the conduct of the marshal has been much censured and threatened with a parliamentary investigation.

— Benjamin Haydon.

The election occurred while Haydon was in prison for the second time. He painted The Mock Election, and sold it to King George IV for £500 (equivalent to £50,000 in 2025).

== See also ==
- Garrat Elections were a carnival of mock elections in the latter 18th century in Wandsworth that took place around 20 May and a crowd of tens of thousands would travel from nearby London to take part, parody or spectate.
