= Benjamin Robert Haydon =

English painter (1786–1846)

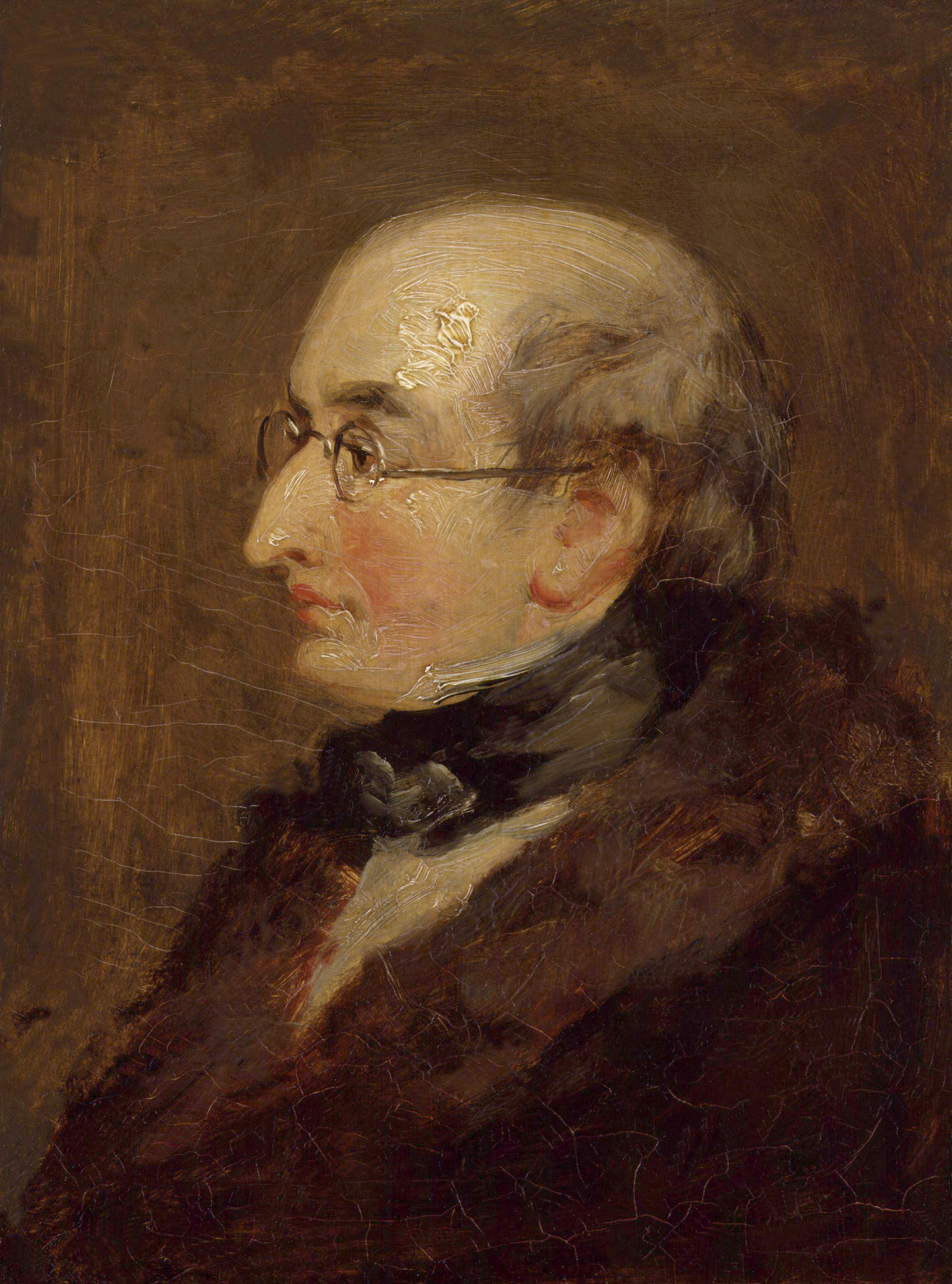
- Self-portrait, c. 1845
- Born: Benjamin Robert Haydon; 26 January 1786; Plymouth, Devon, England
- Died: 22 June 1846 (aged 60); Paddington, London, England
- Occupation: Painter
- Children: 3

Signature
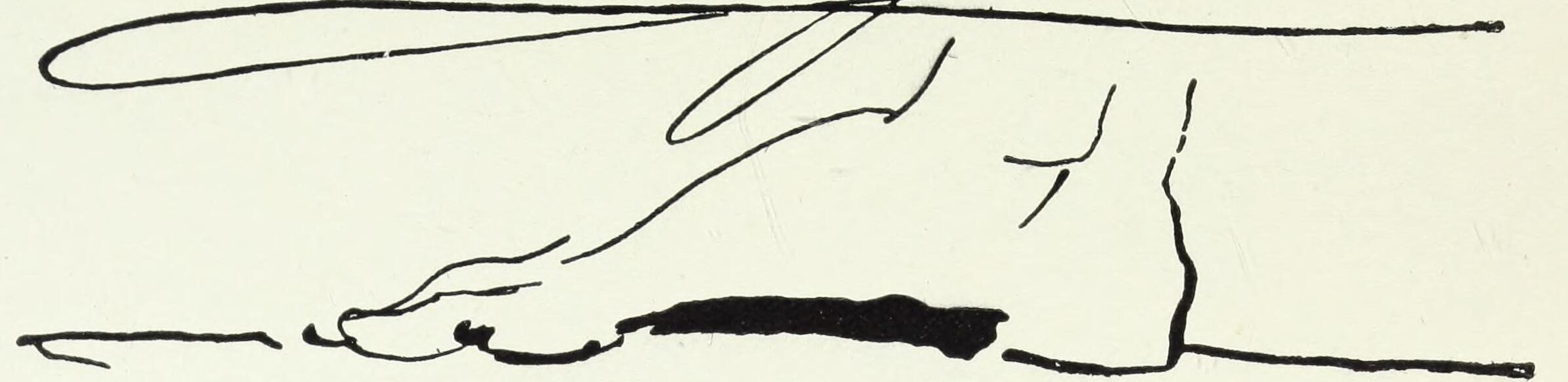

Benjamin Robert Haydon (/ˈheɪdən/; 26 January 1786 – 22 June 1846) was a British painter who specialised in grand historical pictures, although he also painted a few contemporary subjects and portraits. His commercial success was damaged by his often tactless dealings with patrons, and by the enormous scale on which he preferred to work. He was troubled by financial problems throughout his life, which led to several periods of imprisonment for debt.

== Early years ==
=== Childhood ===
Haydon was born in Wimple/Whimple Street Plymouth, the only son of another Benjamin Robert Haydon, a prosperous printer, stationer and publisher, and his wife Mary, the daughter of the Rev. Benjamin Cobley, rector of Dodbrooke, near Kingsbridge, Devon. At an early age he showed an aptitude for study, which was carefully fostered by his mother. At the age of six he was placed in Plymouth Grammar School, and at twelve in Plympton Grammar School, where Sir Joshua Reynolds had received most of his education. Reading Albinus inspired him with a love for anatomy, and from childhood he wanted to become a painter.

=== Royal Academy ===
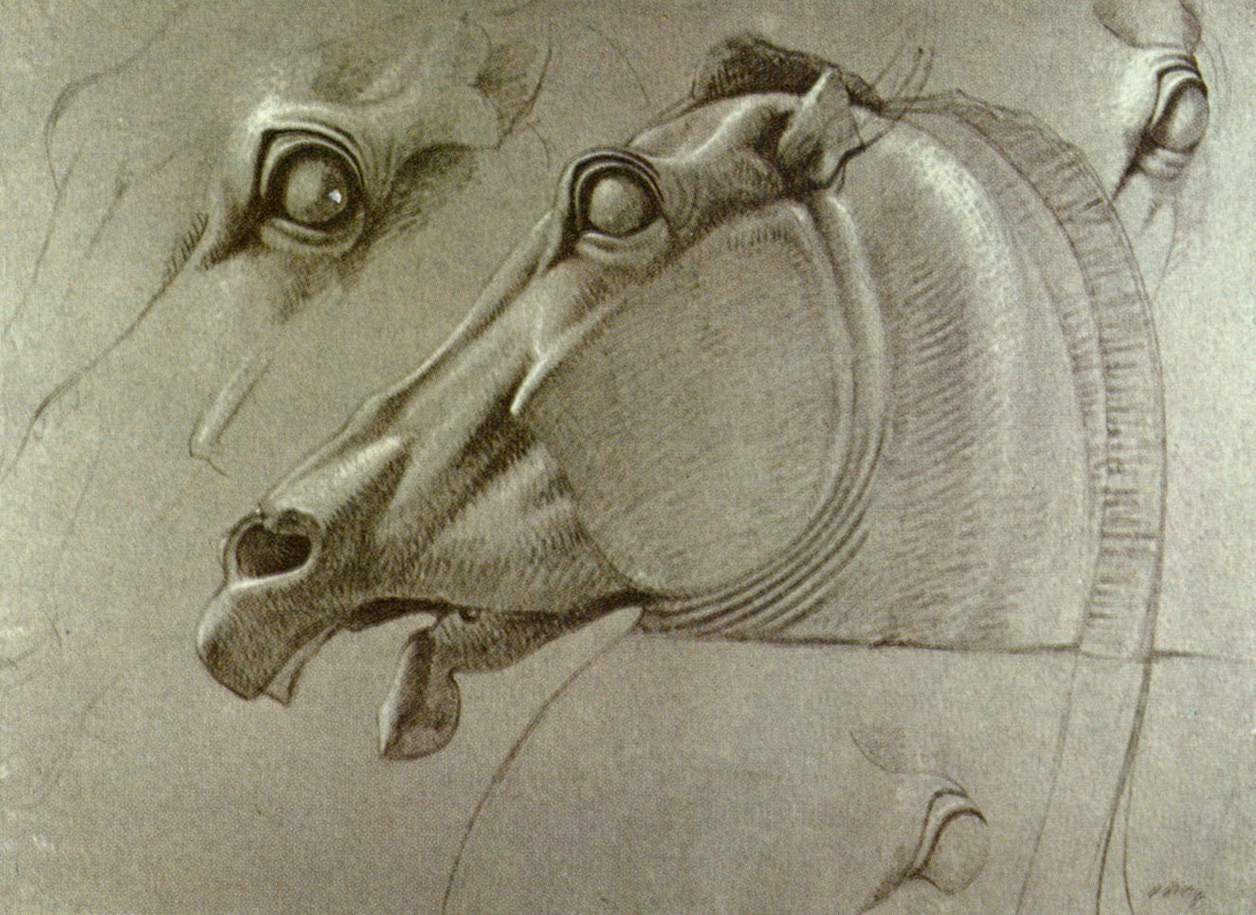
Head of Selene's horse, 1809. Black and white chalk on blue paper. British Museum, London.

Full of energy and hope, he left home, on 14 May 1804, for London, where he entered the Royal Academy Schools. He was so enthusiastic that Henry Fuseli asked when he found time to eat. In 1807, at the age of 21, Haydon exhibited, for the first time, at the Royal Academy. The painting he entered, The Repose in Egypt, was bought by Thomas Hope a year later for the Egyptian Room at his townhouse in Duchess Street. This was a good start for Haydon, who shortly afterwards received a commission from Lord Mulgrave and an introduction to Sir George Beaumont. In 1809 he finished his picture of Dentatus, which, though it increased his fame, resulted in a lifelong quarrel with the Royal Academy, whose committee hung it in a small side-room instead of in the great hall. That same year, he took on his first pupil, Charles Lock Eastlake, later a leading figure in the British art establishment.

=== Financial troubles ===
The financial difficulties which were to dog him for the rest of his life began in 1810 when, in response to Haydon having achieved a certain amount of commercial success, his father stopped paying him his annual allowance of £200. He also became involved in disputes with Beaumont, for whom he had painted a picture of Macbeth, and with Richard Payne Knight, who had outraged Haydon by denying both the aesthetic and the financial value of the sculptures from the Parthenon, recently brought to Britain by Lord Elgin. Haydon was fascinated by the "Elgin Marbles", and believed that they provided evidence that ancient Greek artists had studied anatomy. The Judgment of Solomon, his next production, was sold for £700, to two Plymouth bankers, and also brought £100 voted to him by the directors of the British Institution, and the freedom of the borough of Plymouth. The income was not enough to pay off all his debts, but it maintained his credit, allowing him to continue borrowing.

== Height of career ==
=== Early paintings ===
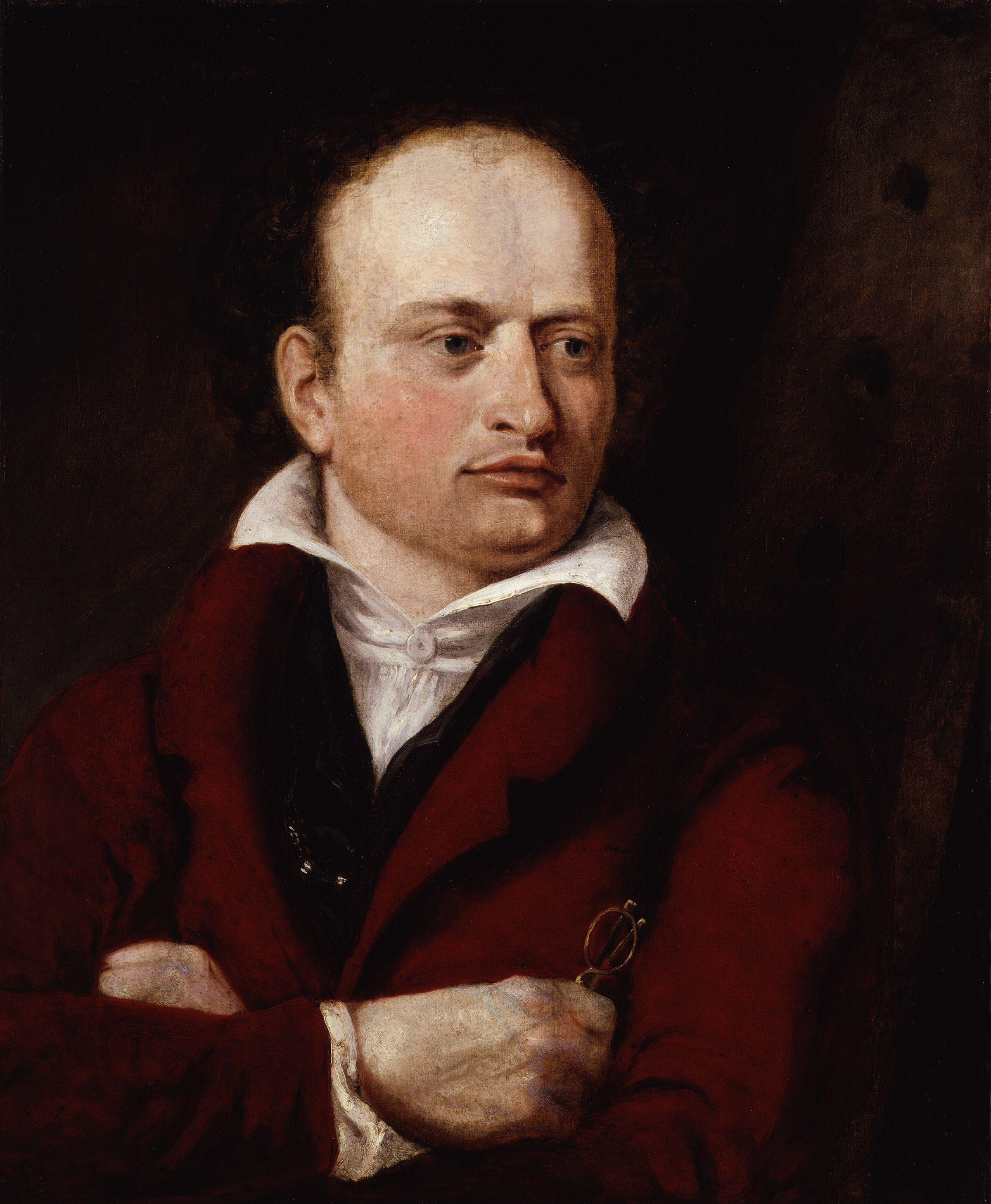
Portrait of Haydon by his pupil Georgiana Zornlin, 1825

At the end of May 1814 Haydon took advantage of the cessation of hostilities with France to visit Paris with his friend David Wilkie, and see the art collections gathered by Napoleon from across Europe at the Louvre. Much of what he saw there disappointed him: he described Raphael's Transfiguration, a painting he had particularly wanted to see, as "small & insignificant". At François Gérard's studio he saw a portrait of Napoleon, and began to develop a fascination with the defeated French leader, although, unlike some of his more radical friends such as William Hazlitt, Haydon never admired him politically.

On returning to England, he produced Christ's Entry into Jerusalem, which was later to form the nucleus of the American Gallery of Painting, erected by his cousin, John Haviland of Philadelphia. While painting another large work, the Resurrection of Lazarus, his financial problems increased, and he was arrested but not imprisoned, the sheriff-officer taking his word for his appearance. In October, 1821, he increased his commitments when he married Mary Hyman, a widow with two young children, whom he had known for some years. In 1823 Haydon spent two months imprisoned for debt in the King's Bench Prison, where he received consoling letters from leading men of the day. While there, he drew up a petition to Parliament in favour of the appointment of "a committee to inquire into the state of encouragement of historical painting", which was presented by Lord Brougham.

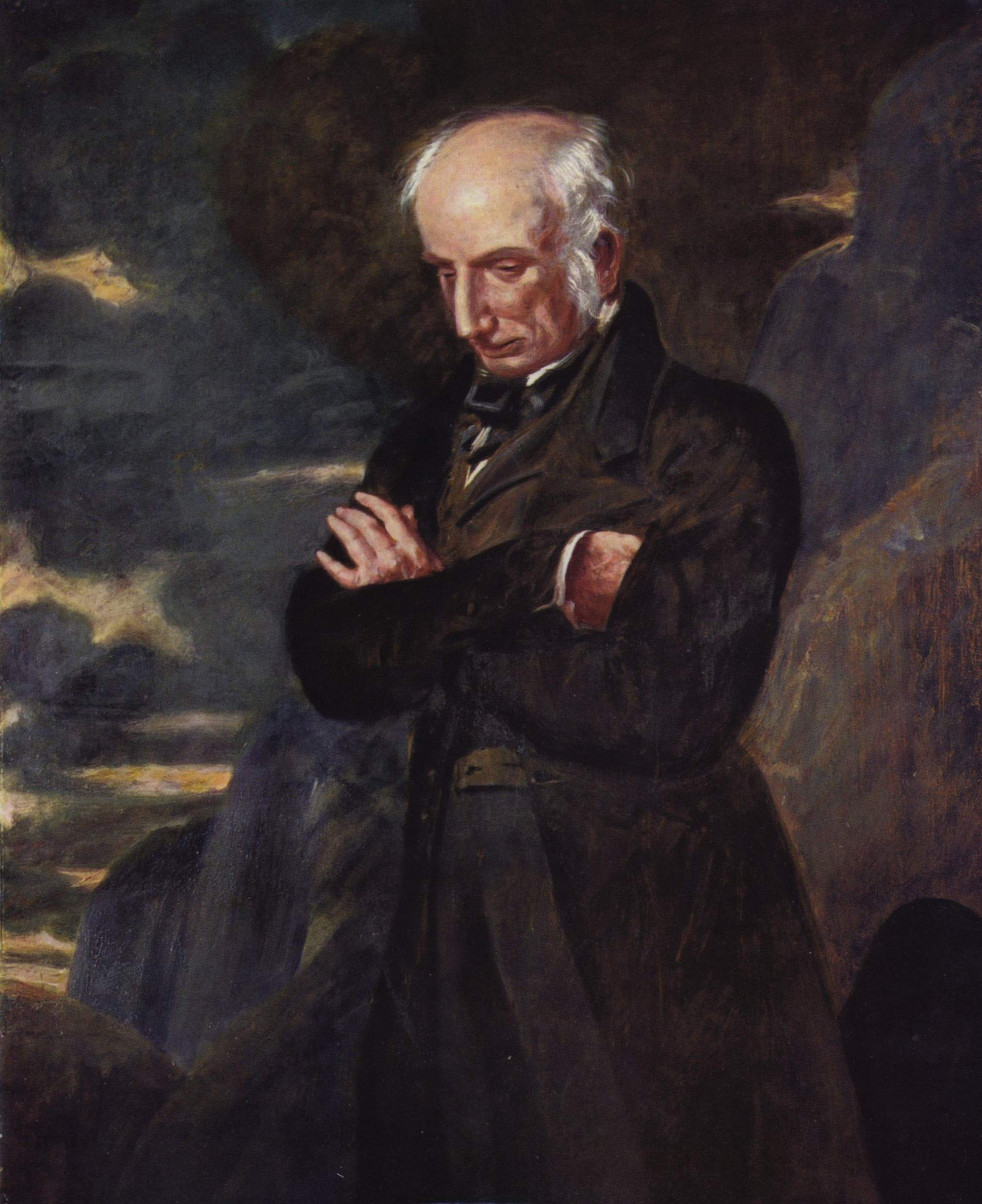
Portrait of William Wordsworth, 1842

=== Further paintings ===
During 1825, following an agreement for his financial support with his lawyer, Thomas Kearsey, Haydon turned, rather unwillingly, to portrait painting, and at first had considerable success. His works in the genre were, however, attacked in a savage review in Theodore Hook's weekly newspaper John Bull. Haydon later blamed the article for his loss of clientele, and falling back into unmanageable levels of debt. Following a second period of incarceration at the King's Bench Prison in 1827, he painted the Mock Election inspired by an incident he had witnessed there. The picture was bought by King George IV for £500. Encouraged by this success, he painted a companion picture, Chairing the Member, returning to the prison to make drawings of some of the inmates. A third painting of contemporary life showed the audience at a Punch and Judy show in the New Road at Marylebone. His hopes that the king would buy this work were disappointed, a setback he blamed on the actions of the Keeper of the King's Pictures, William Seguier.

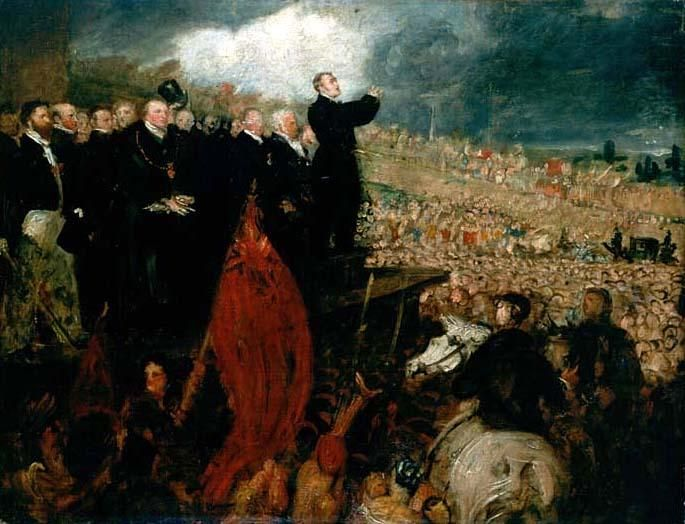
Sketch for Meeting of the Birmingham Political Union

Among Haydon's other pictures were: Eucles (1829); Napoleon at St Helena, for Sir Robert Peel; Xenophon, on his Retreat with the 'Ten Thousand,' first seeing the Sea; and Waiting for the Times, purchased by the Marquis of Stafford (all 1831); and Falstaff and Achilles playing the Lyre (1832). Curtius Leaping into the Gulf, and Uriel and Satan. (1843) As a supporter of parliamentary reform, he had the idea of painting a grand canvas of a meeting on Newhall Hill near the Jewellery Quarter, addressed by Thomas Attwood, leader of the Birmingham Political Union. Attempts to raise subscriptions to fund the painting failed, and only sketches were ever made, but Haydon did receive a commission from the new Whig prime minister, Lord Grey, for a picture of the Reform Banquet held at the Guildhall. Completed in 1834, The Reform Banquet contained 597 individual portraits. He also made a painting of the Meeting of the Anti-Slavery Society, now in the National Portrait Gallery.

== Later years ==
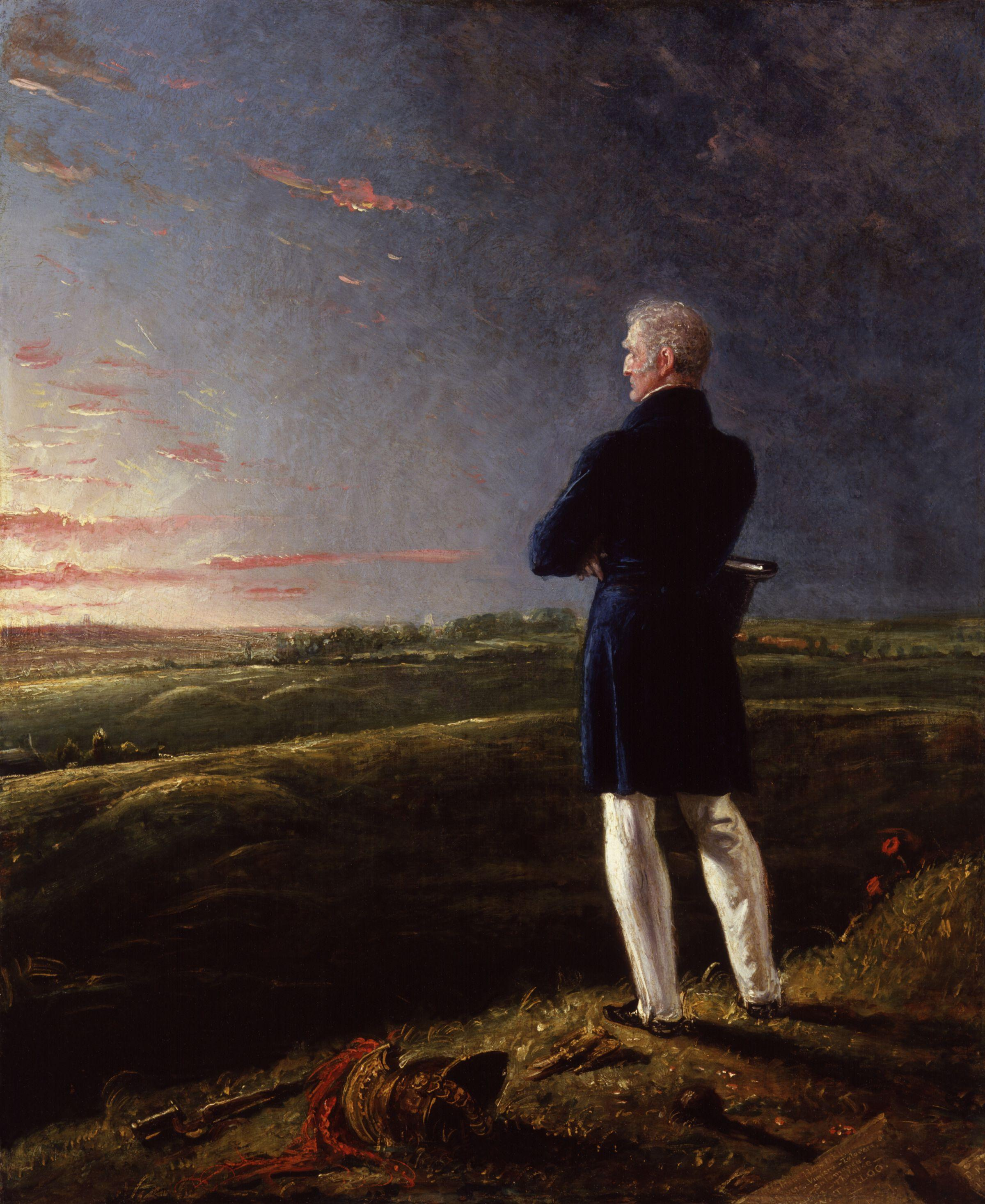
Arthur Wellesley, 1st Duke of Wellington by Benjamin Robert Haydon

Haydon became well known as a lecturer on painting, and from 1835 onwards travelled throughout England and Scotland on lecture tours. He campaigned to have the country's public buildings decorated with history paintings showing the glories of the nation's past, and within three days of the destruction of the Palace of Westminster by fire in 1834 he visited the prime minister, Lord Melbourne, in order to impress on him the importance of government patronage of art, especially in relation to the opportunities offered by the rebuilding made necessary by the disaster. Although a scheme along the lines of his suggestions was in fact carried out at the Houses of Parliament, Haydon played no part in it. When, in 1843, an exhibition was held at Westminster Hall, to choose designs for paintings to decorate the Houses of Parliament, he submitted two cartoons – The Curse of Adam and Edward the Black Prince – but the commission charged with choosing artists to carry out the work (which included his former pupil, Eastlake) found neither suitable.

He then painted The Banishment of Aristides, which was exhibited, along with other works, at the Egyptian Hall in Piccadilly, where he had hired a gallery several times over the years. The American dwarf General Tom Thumb was then appearing at the same venue; over the Easter week 12,000 people paid to see him, while only 133 visited Haydon's exhibition.

=== Death ===
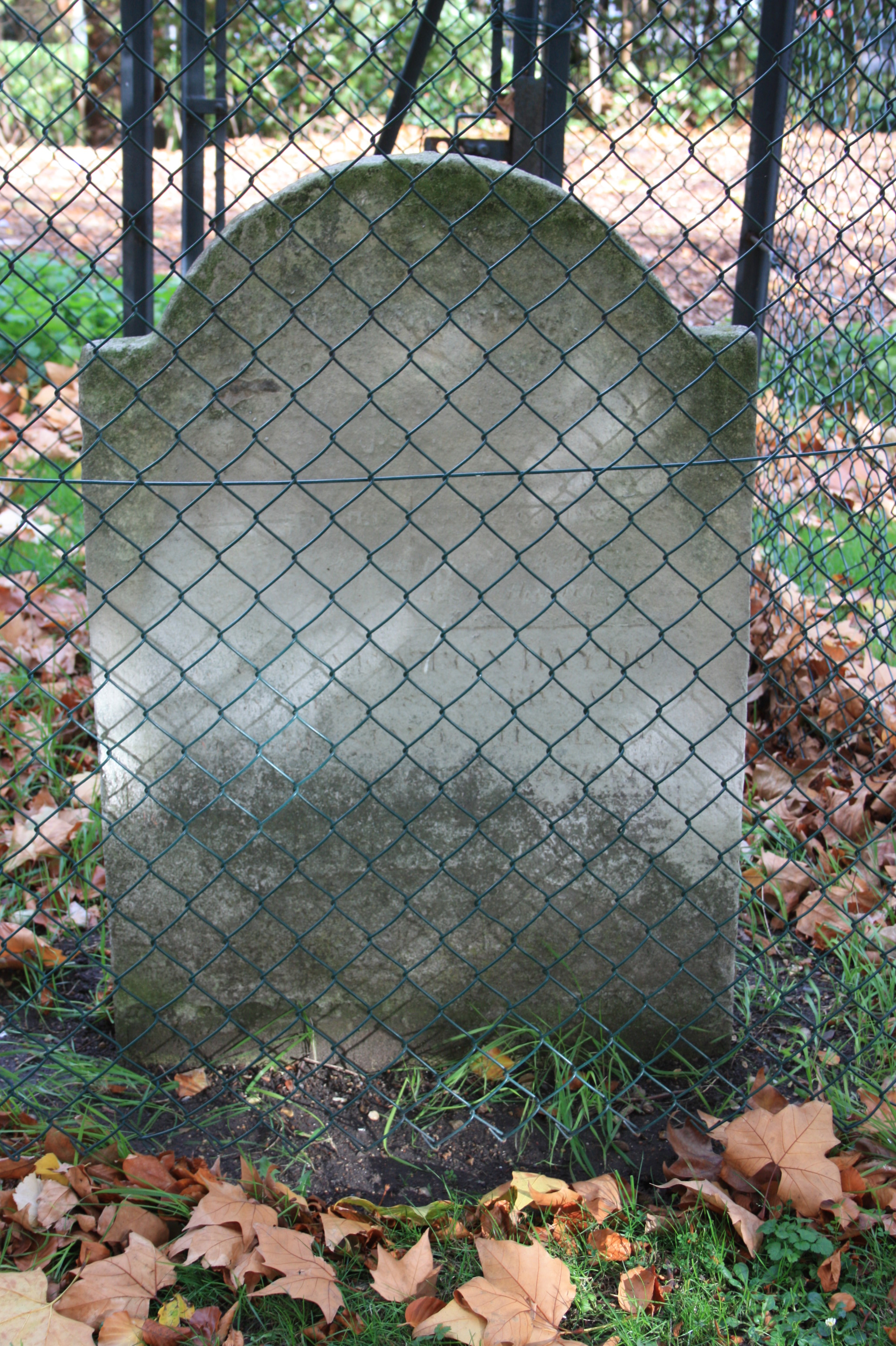
The grave of Haydon, St Mary's Cemetery, Paddington

The artist's difficulties increased to such an extent that, whilst employed on his last grand effort, Alfred and the Trial by Jury, overcome by debts of over £3,000, disappointment, and ingratitude, he wrote "Stretch me no longer on this rough world," and attempted suicide by shooting himself. The bullet failed to kill him, and he finished the task by cutting his throat. He left a widow and three surviving children, who were generously supported by Haydon's friends, including Sir Robert Peel, the Count d'Orsay, Thomas Talfourd and Lord Carlisle. A resident of Paddington, he was buried just to the north-west of the grave of Sarah Siddons at St Mary's Church, Paddington, London. The cemetery was converted to a park, St Mary's Gardens, in 1885. Haydon's is one of the few preserved stones. It is modest and eroded but his name is still (2014) just legible.

== Writings ==
In 1839 Haydon began work on an autobiography, drawing on materials from his extensive diaries. Before his death he had completed the story of his life up to the year 1820. It was published in three volumes in 1853, edited by Tom Taylor, with additional material from the diaries, under the title Life of Benjamin Robert Haydon, Historical Painter, from his Autobiography and Journals.

The autobiography was assessed by the Encyclopædia Britannica Eleventh Edition in this way:

To form a correct estimate of Haydon it is necessary to read his autobiography. This is one of the most natural books ever written, full of various and abundant power, and fascinating to the reader. [...] His love for his art was both a passion and a principle. He found patrons difficult to manage, and, not having the tact to lead them gently, he tried to drive them fiercely. He failed; abused patrons and patronage, and intermingled talk of the noblest independence with acts not always dignified. He was self-willed to perversity, but his perseverance was such as is seldom associated with so much vehemence and passion. [...] To the last he believed in his own powers and in the ultimate triumph of art. [...] He proclaimed himself the apostle and martyr of high art, and, not without some justice, believed himself to have a claim on the sympathy and support of the nation.

Every reader of his autobiography will be struck by the frequency and fervour of the short prayers interspersed throughout the work. Haydon had an overwhelming sense of a personal, overruling and merciful providence, which influenced his relations with his family, and to some extent with the world. [...] His eager and combative character was partly his enemy, but he had other enemies actuated by motives as unworthy as his own were always high-pitched and on abstract grounds laudable.

Haydon's Lectures, published shortly after their delivery, showed that he was as bold a writer as painter. He also wrote the long and elaborate article on "Painting," in the 7th edition of the Encyclopædia Britannica.

== Critical opinion ==
Charles Dickens wrote in 1846 that "All his life [Haydon] had utterly mistaken his vocation. No amount of sympathy with him and sorrow for him in his manly pursuit of a wrong idea for so many years – until, by dint of his perseverance and courage it almost began to seem a right one – ought to prevent one from saying that he most unquestionably was a very bad painter, and that his pictures could not be expected to sell or to succeed." Dickens also observed Haydon's art to be "quite marvellous in its badness".

== Legacy ==
=== Pupils ===
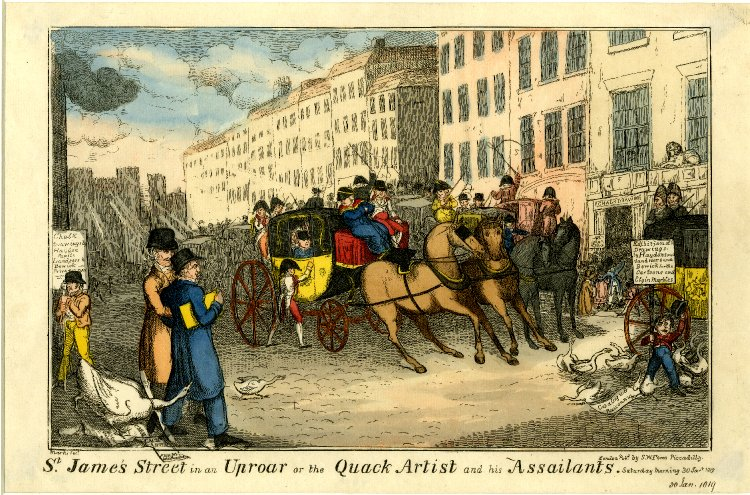
St James' Street in an Uproar or the Quack Artist and his Assailants (1819). Satirical print aimed at Haydon (at the left in blue) and William Paulet Carey (represented by the goose behind him). Carey had criticised Haydon's charging for admission to an exhibition of eight chalk drawings.

Haydon had several pupils. These included Charles and Edwin Landseer, William Bewick, John Jackson and Edward Chatfield.

=== In written works ===
- William Wordsworth addressed a sonnet To B.R. Haydon in 1815.
- John Keats named Haydon in several of his works, including Addressed to Haydon (1816), To Haydon, and To Haydon with a Sonnet Written on Seeing the Elgin Marbles (1817).
- Lara Kriegel, in her 2007 book Grand Designs: Labor, Empire, and the Museum in Victorian Culture, has examined Haydon's activities as a design reformer, especially his argument that mechanics and artisans should learn to draw from the figure in order to learn principles of taste.
- Aldous Huxley’s 1921 short story “The Tillotson Banquet” revolves around the rediscovery of a fictional pupil of Haydon and the character of Lypiatt in Antic Hay is thought by some to be based on Haydon himself.
- Alethea Hayter's group biography A Sultry Month (1965) reconstructs events in London during a heatwave from June 18 to July 13 1846, with Haydon's suicide as the focal point.
- Penelope Hughes-Hallett's The Immortal Dinner (2000) celebrates the famous dinner of Christmas 1817 given by Haydon for Keats, Wordsworth, Charles Lamb and others.

=== In drama ===
- In 1977, the British actor Leonard Rossiter played Haydon in a West End play, written by satirist John Wells, titled The Immortal Haydon. It is held to be one of Rossiter's greatest performances. A BBC camera crew from the documentary series Arena filmed his rehearsals for the show. Rossiter had previously (1969) broadcast a monologue adapted by Eric Ewens from the artist's journals.
- In 2007, Nunkie Theatre Company premiered Blood, Bone and Genius, a new one-man play based on Haydon's life and diaries, written and performed by Robert Lloyd Parry, in the historic life-drawing classroom of the Royal Academy Schools in London. The first performance took place on 22 June, the 161st anniversary of Haydon's suicide. It was specially written to tie in with "The Body Politic," a display of Haydon's anatomical drawings at the Royal Academy of Art.
- In 2008, Vancouver's Touchstone Theatre premiered Influence, written by Janet Munsil and directed by Katrina Dunn. The story centres on John Keats' first visit to see the Elgin Marbles, as the guest of Haydon, where they unexpectedly encounter the Greek gods Athena, Hephaestus, and Apollo. The play is set at a time when Keats was still an unknown, under the mentorship of Haydon. The premiere performance was 6 November 2008.
- In the 2014 film Mr. Turner, Haydon is played by Martin Savage. He is portrayed both ranting at the Royal Academy, London, at odds with all other Fellows, and in the context of borrowing a large sum of money from Turner, which rather than accepting graciously, is taken with bitterness, as he wishes the sum to be larger.

== Gallery ==
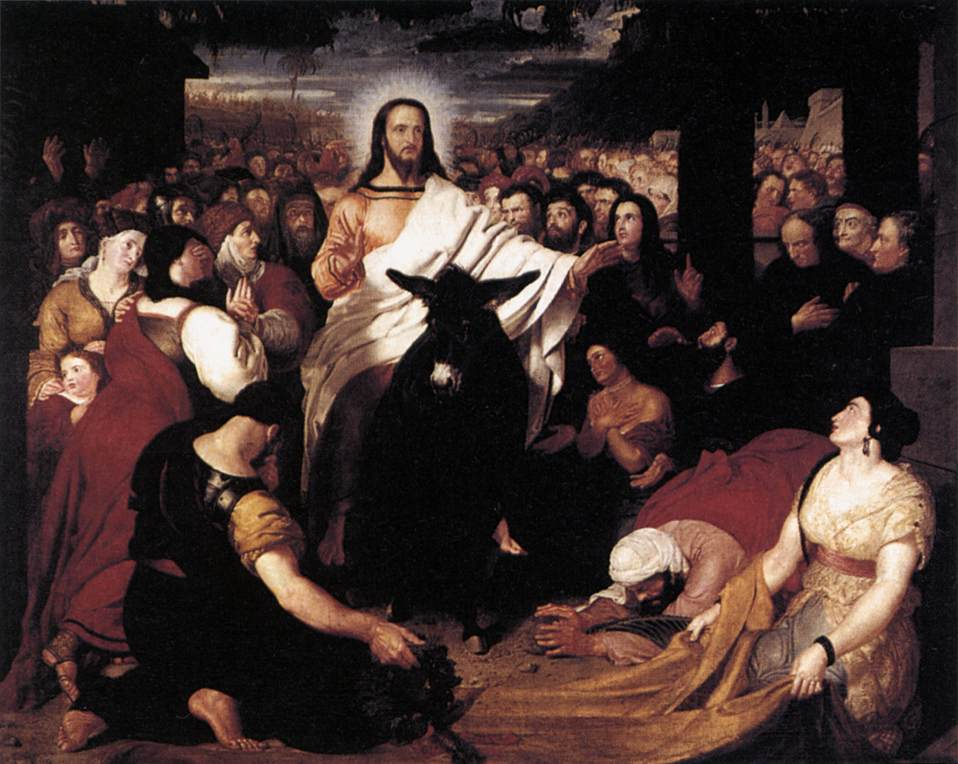
Christ's Entry into Jerusalem (between 1814 and 1820)

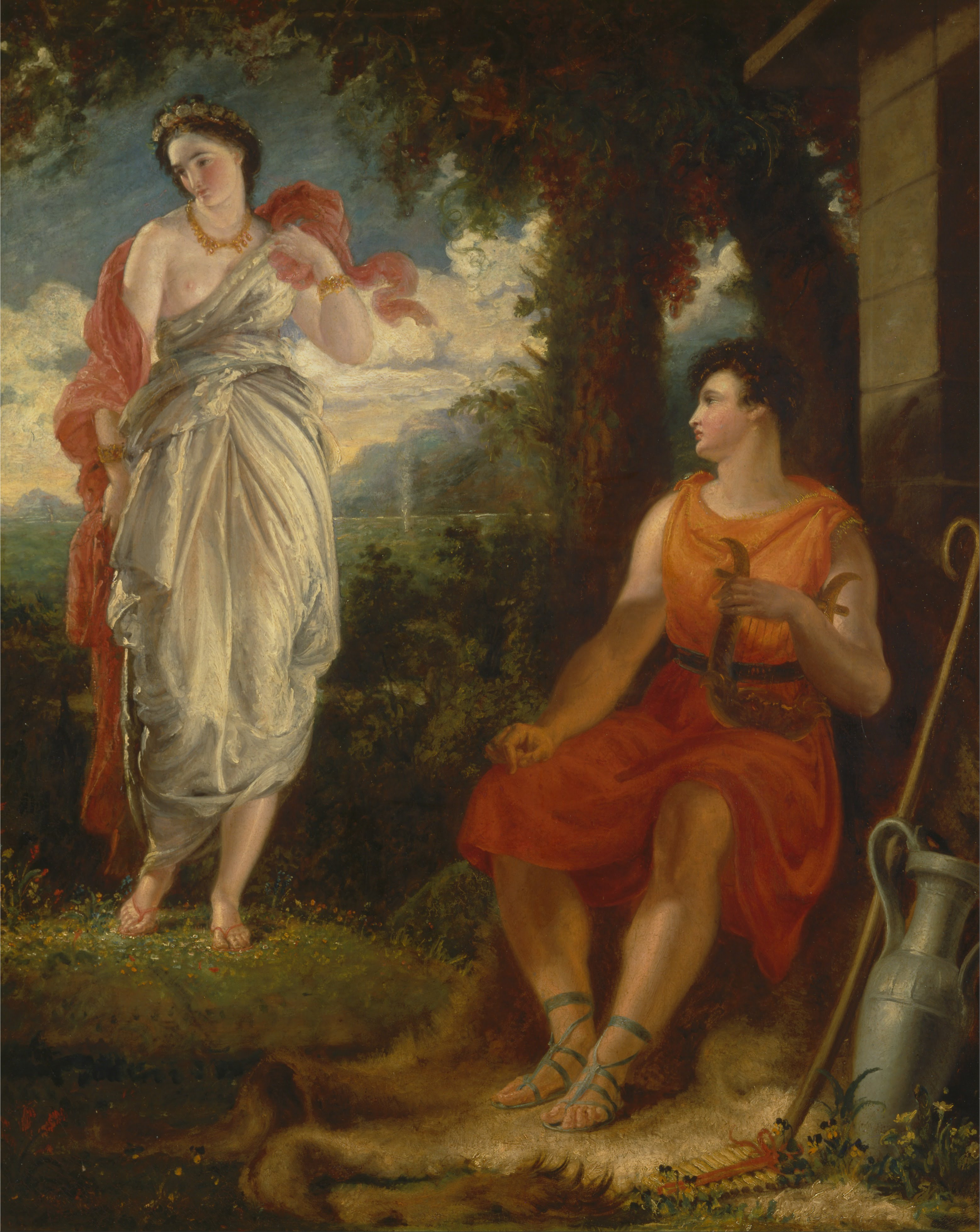
Venus and Anchises (1826)

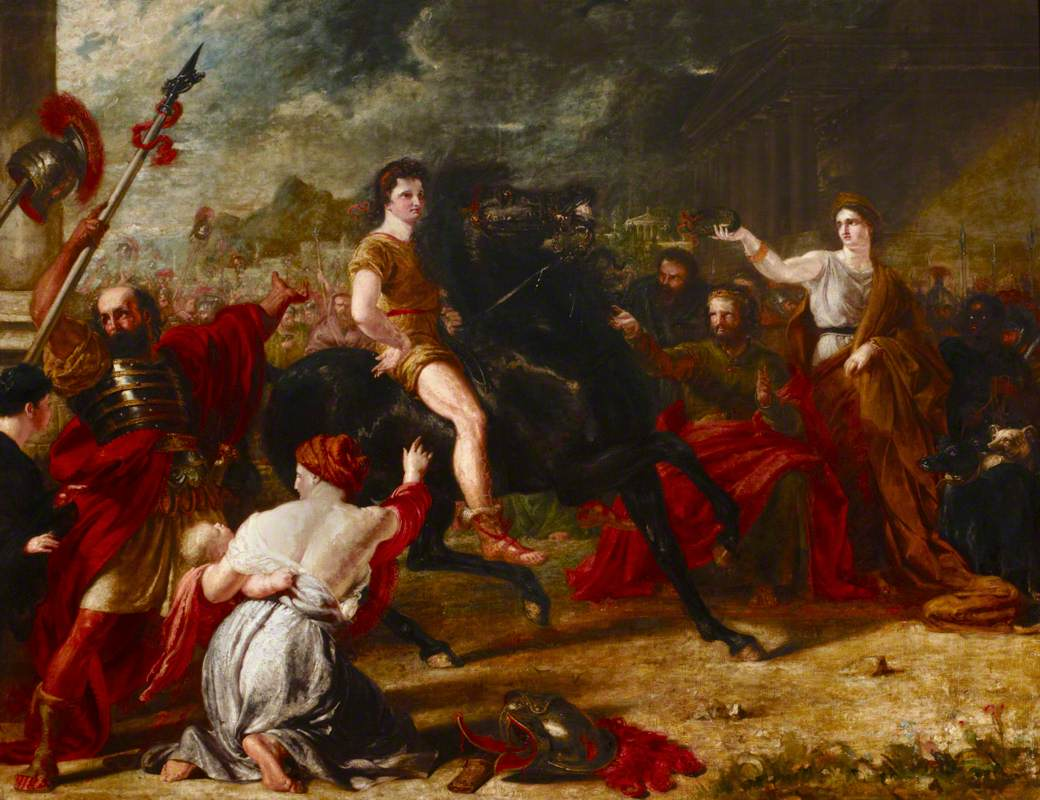
Alexander the Great Taming Bucephalus (1826)

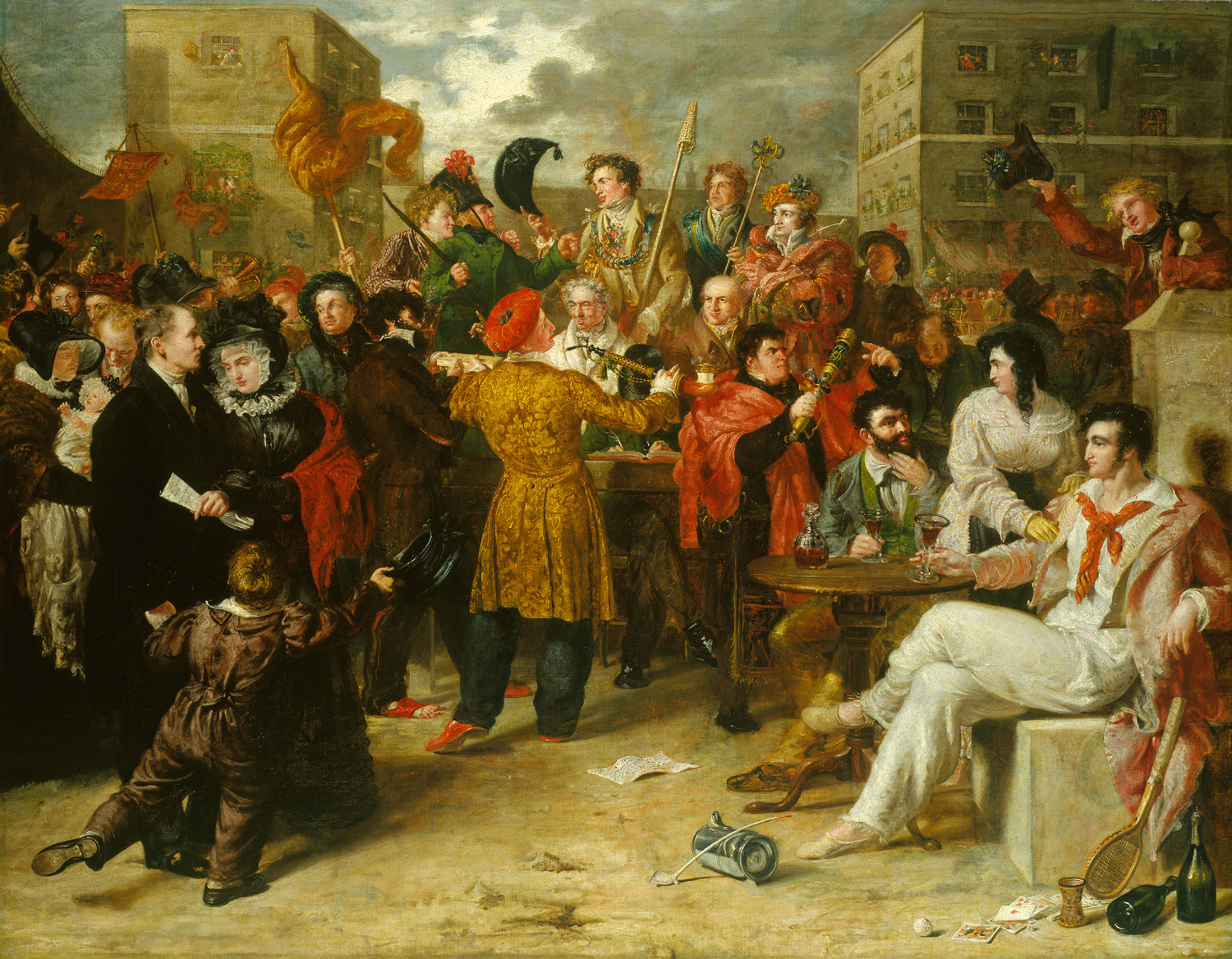
The Mock Election (1827)

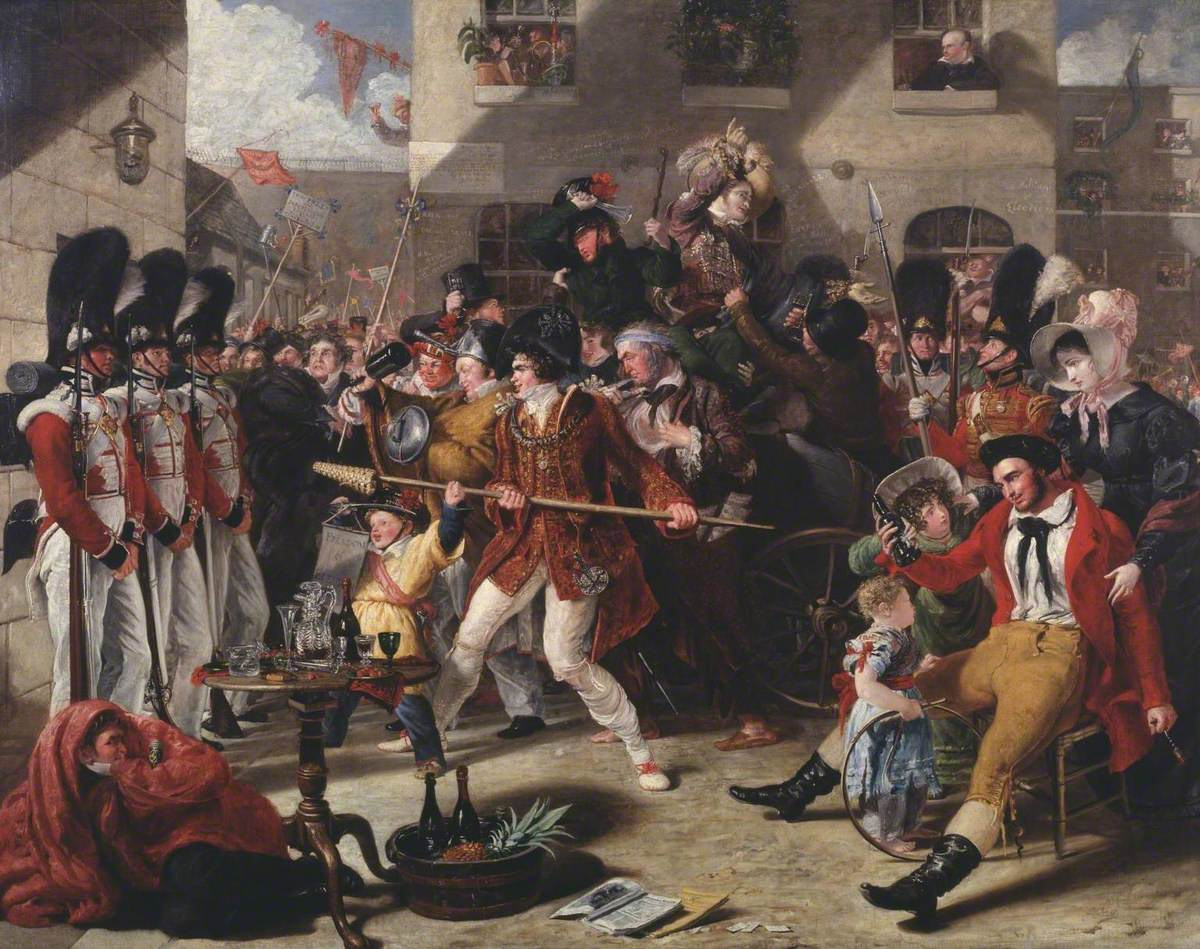
Chairing the Member (1828)

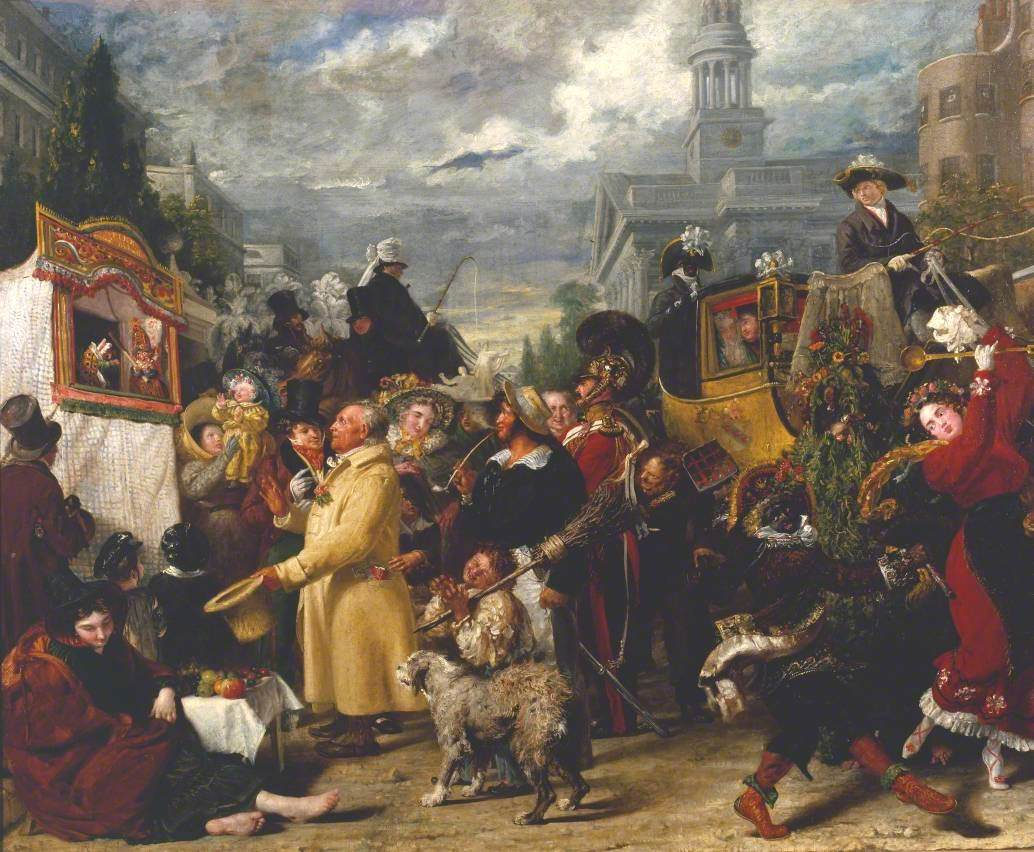
Punch or May Day (1829)

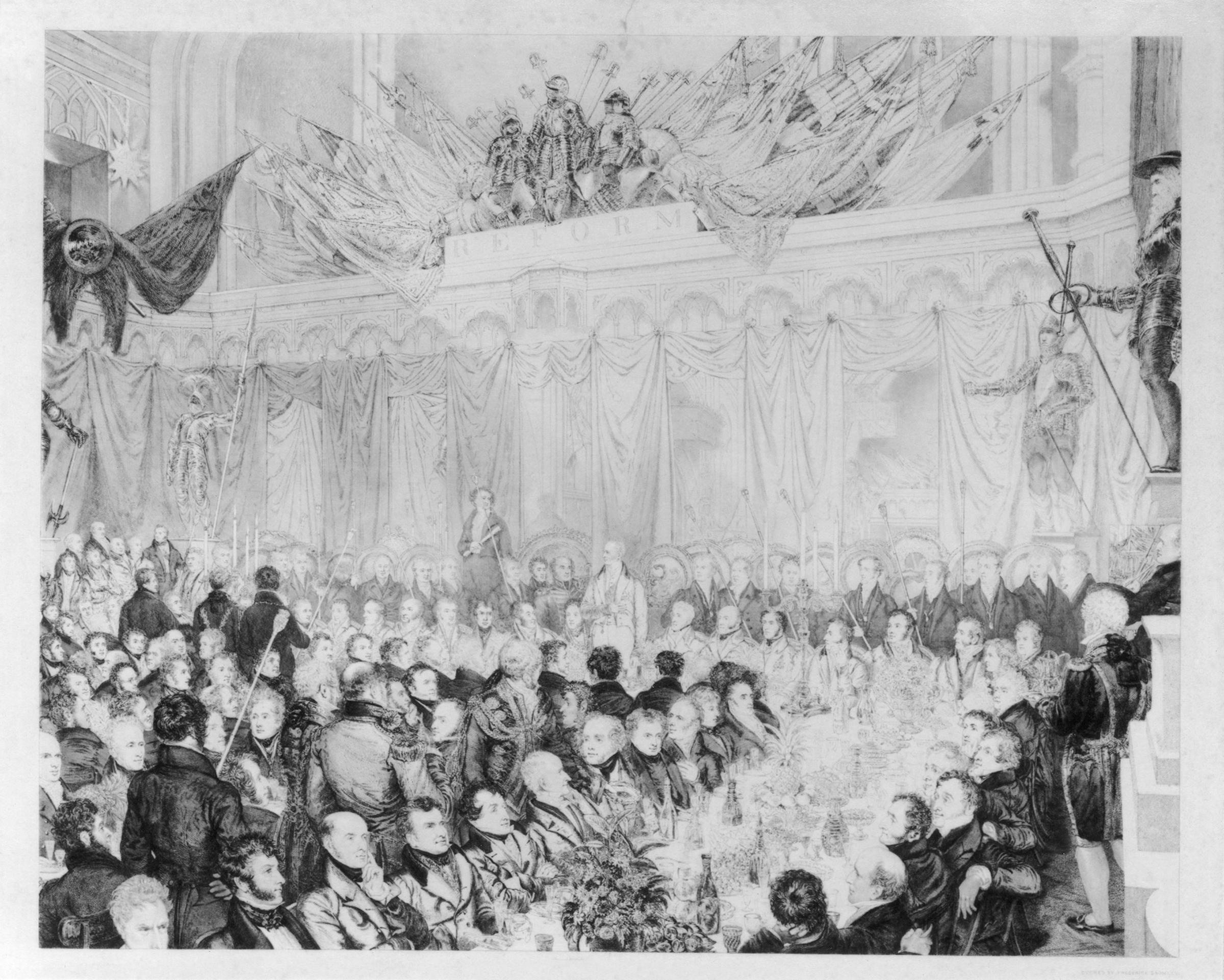
The Reform Banquet, (1833). Print based on Haydon's original paintings

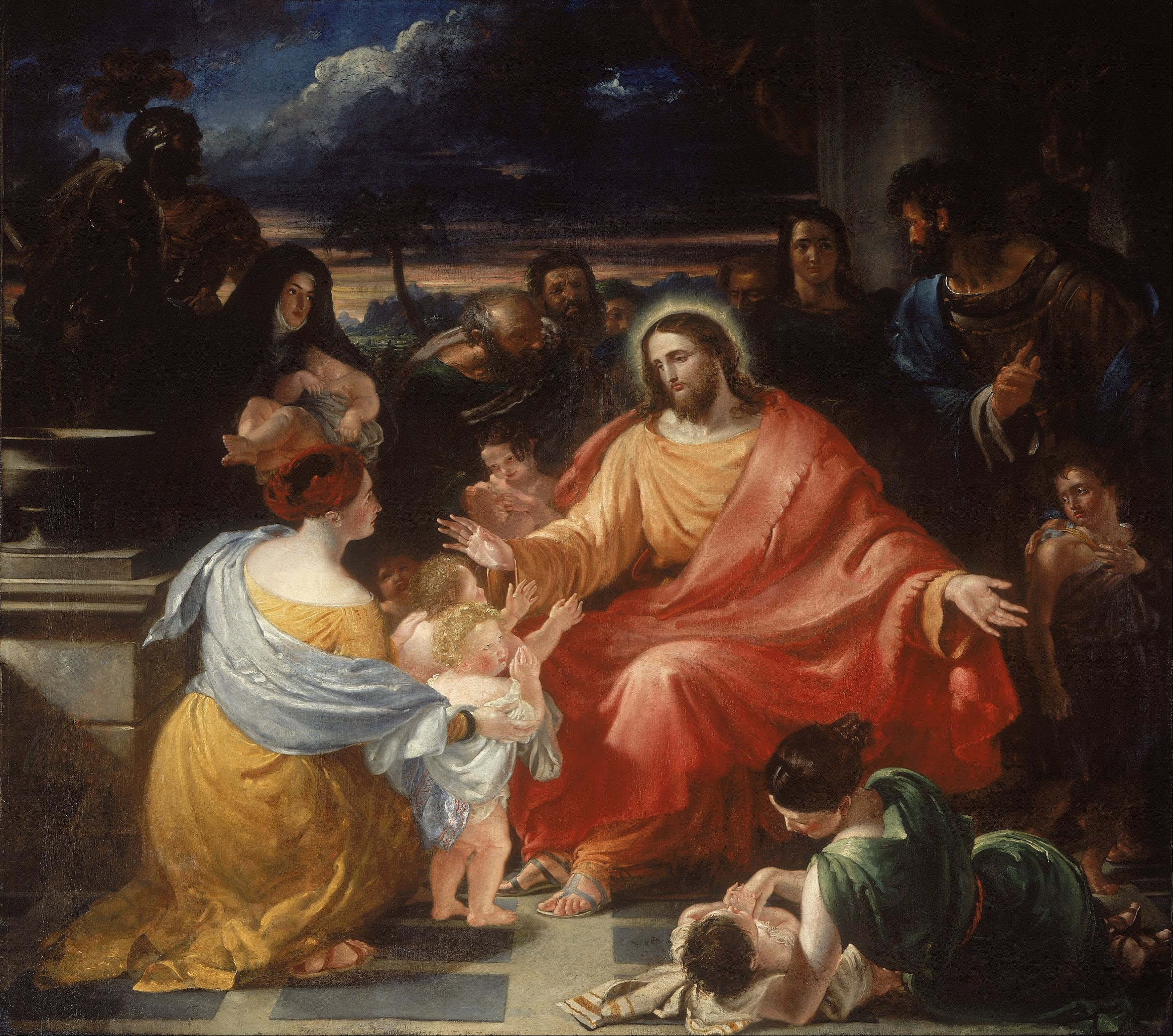
Blessing the Little Children (1837) which is on display at the Walker Art Gallery, Liverpool.

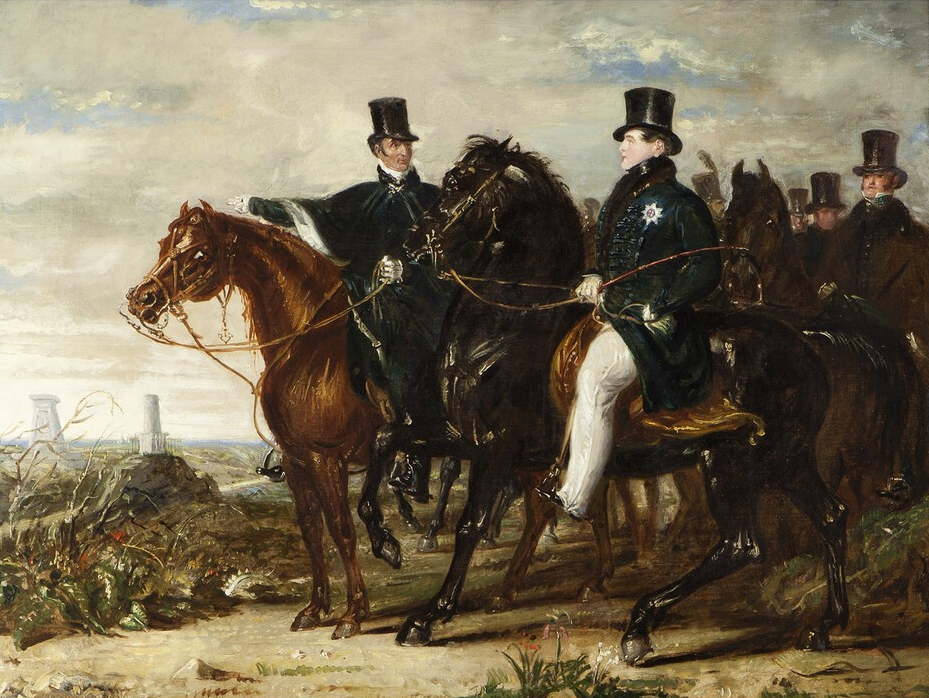
The Duke of Wellington Describing the Field of Waterloo to George IV (1840)

The Anti-Slavery Society Convention, 1840 (1841)

The Black Prince Thanking Lord James Audley for his Gallantry in the Battle of Poitiers (1842)

The Maid of Saragossa (1842)

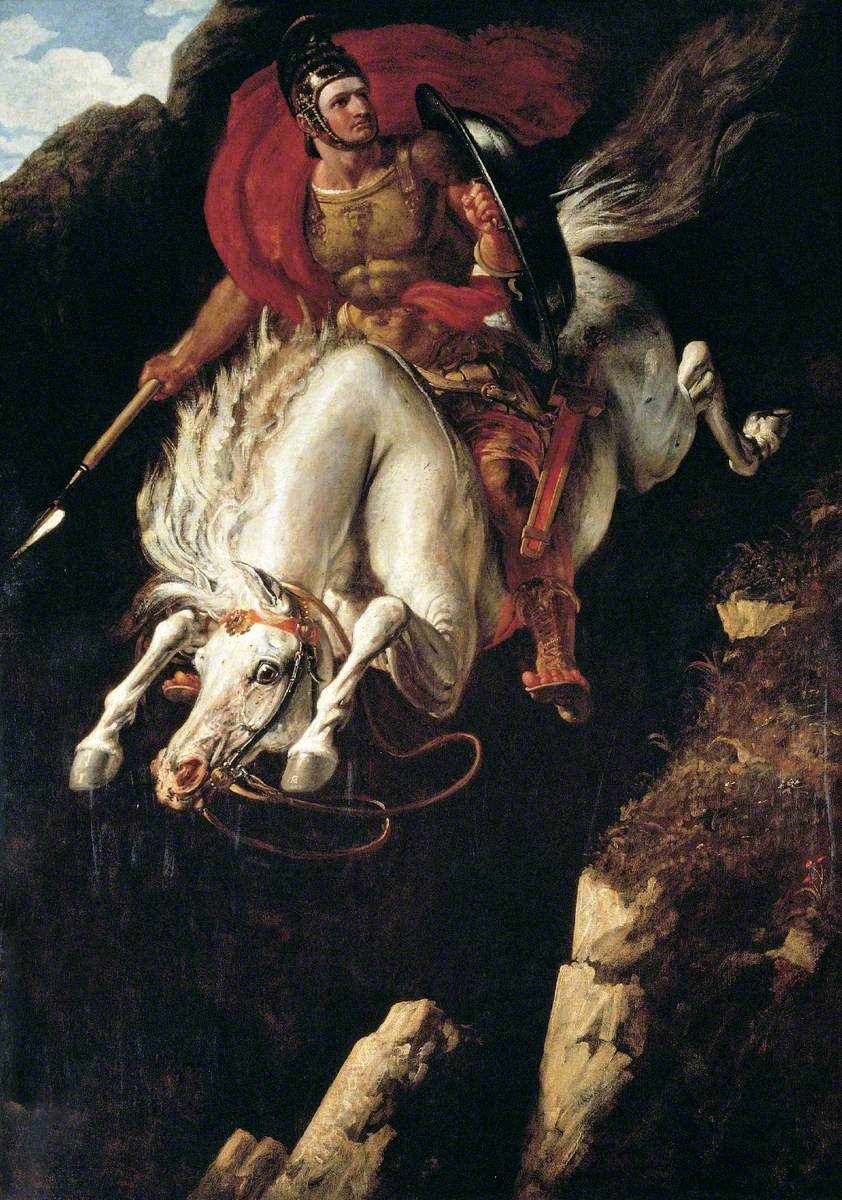
Curtius Leaping into the Gulf (1842)

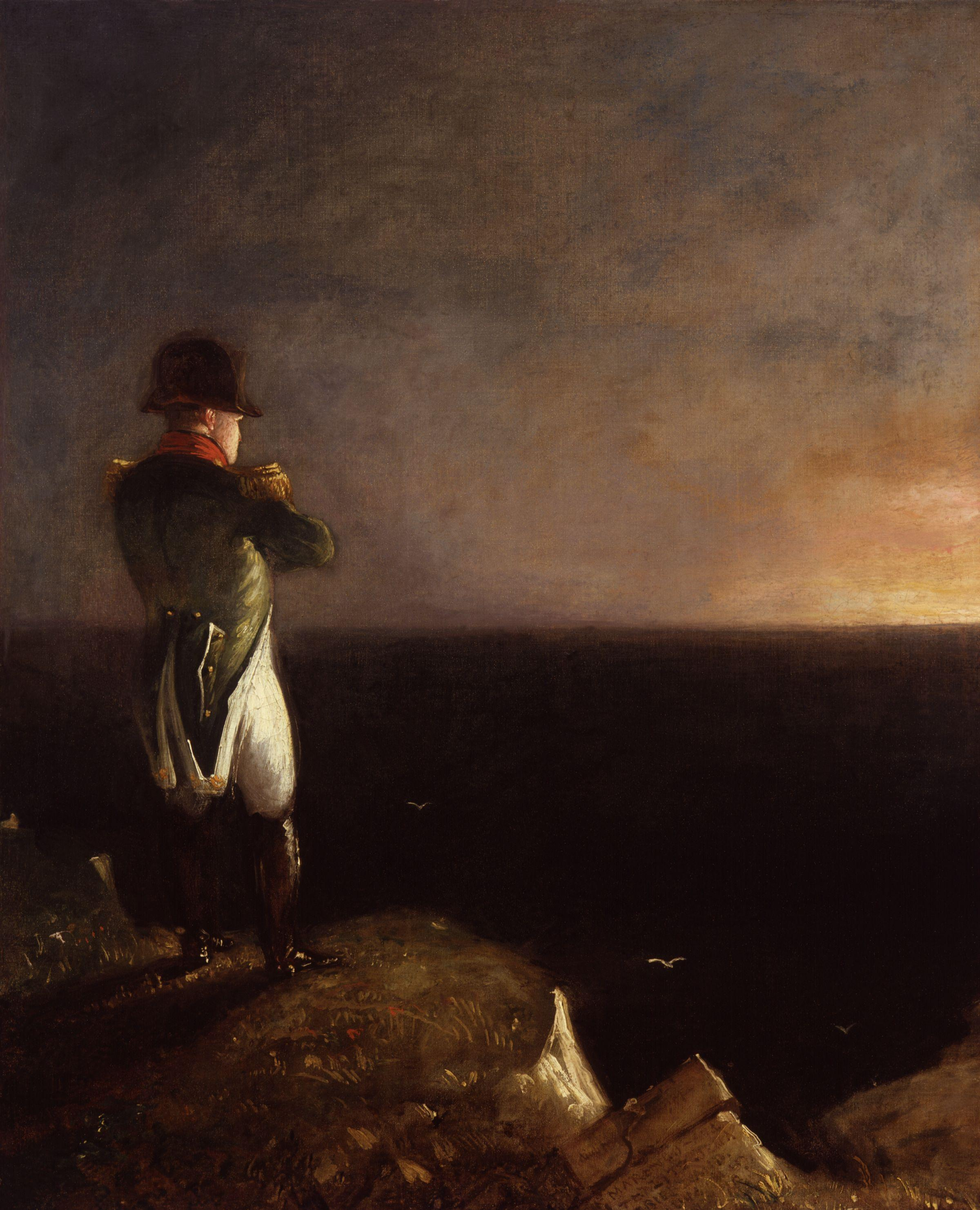
Napoleon Bonaparte (date unknown)

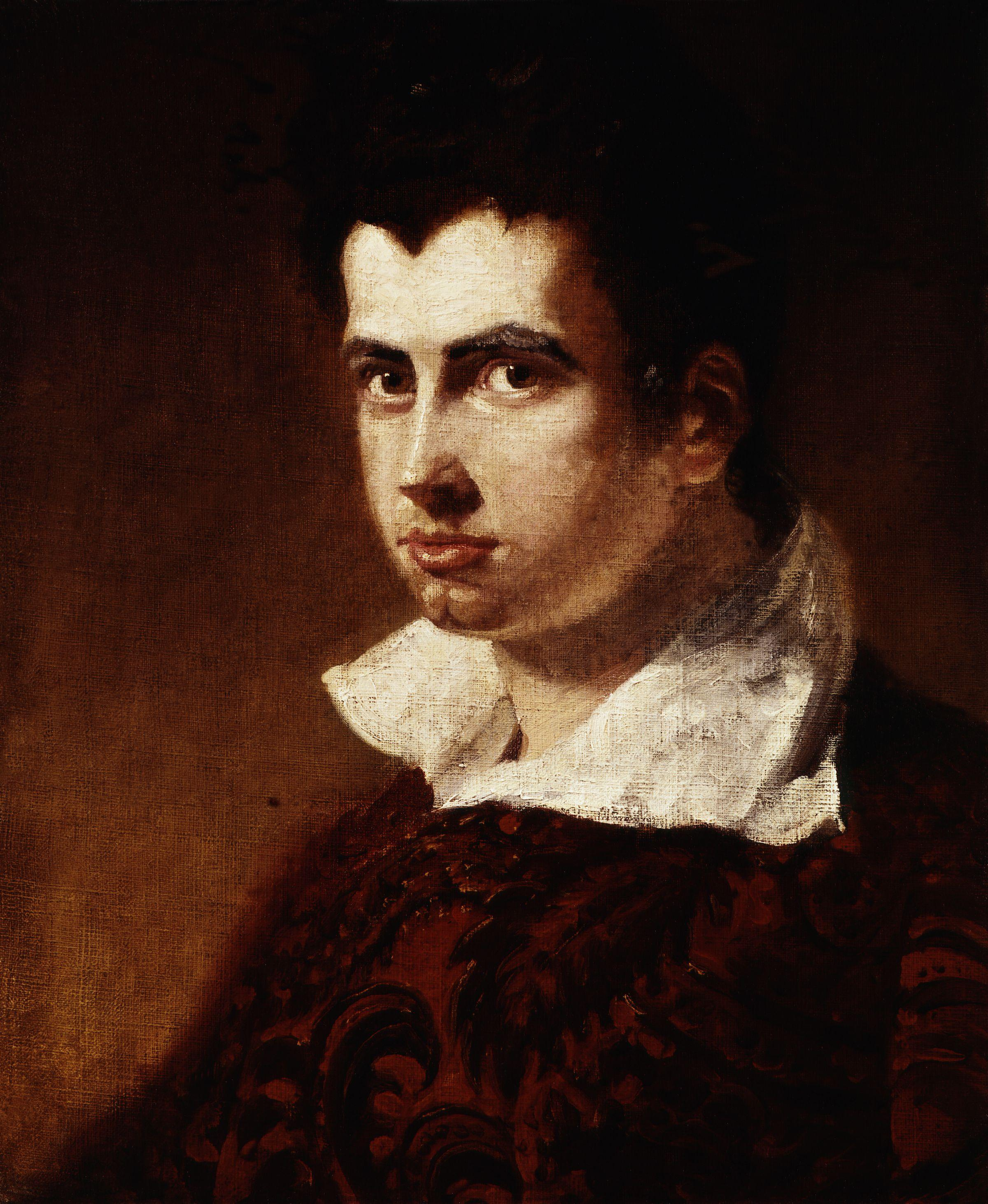
James Henry Leigh Hunt (date unknown)

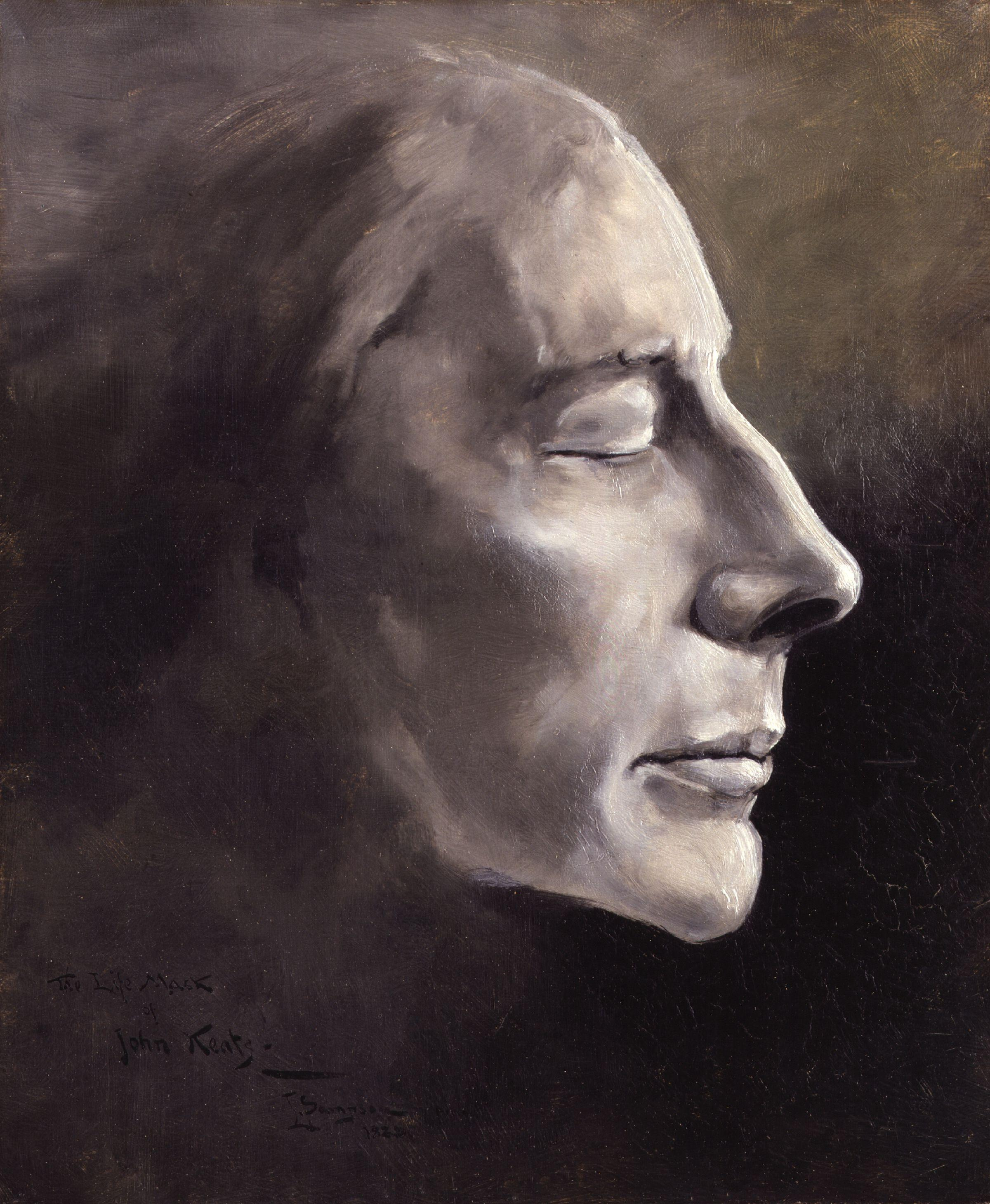
John Keats (date unknown)

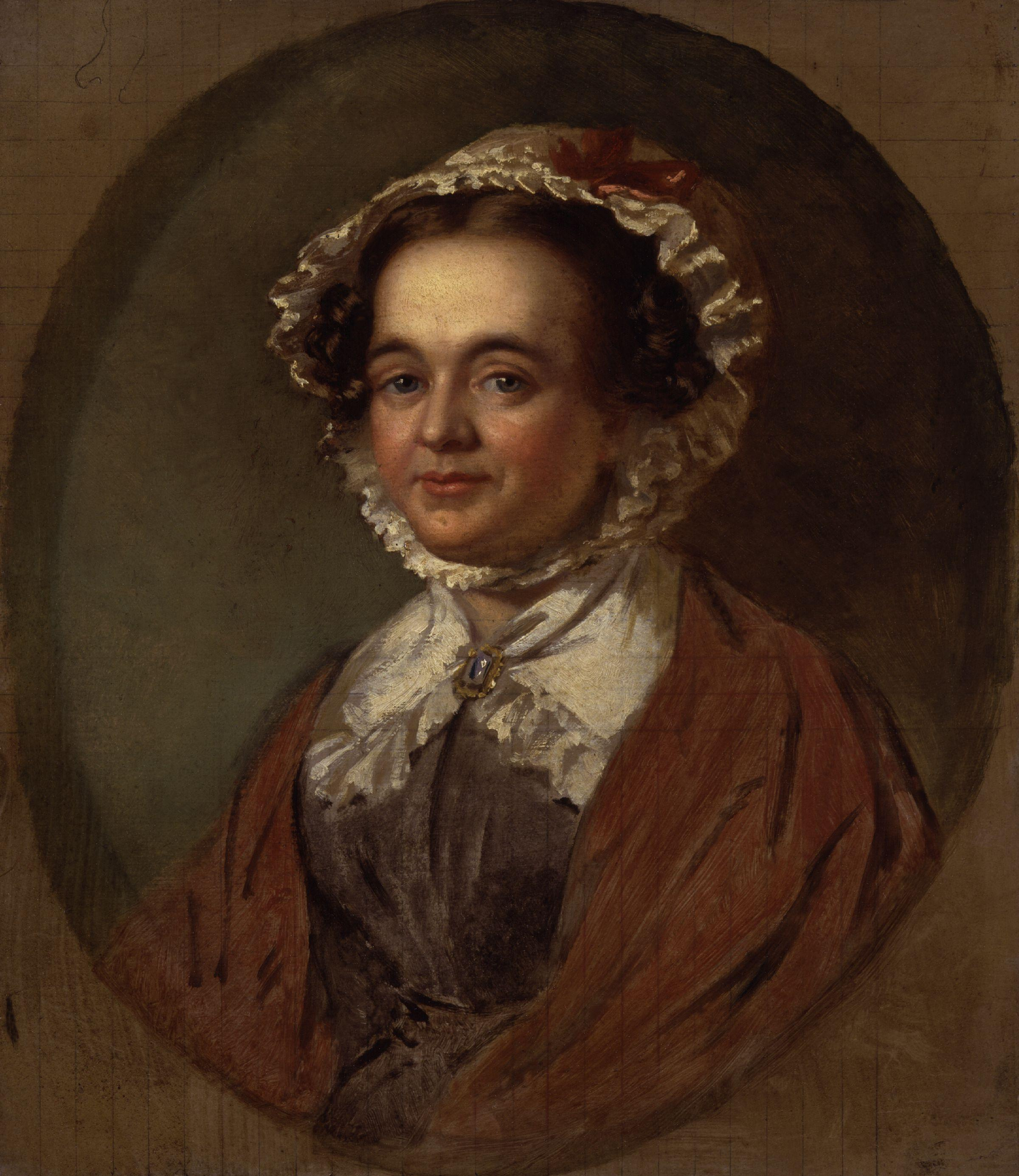
Mary Russell Mitford (date unknown)

== References and sources ==
Sources

- O'Keefe, Paul (2009). A Genius for Failure: The Life of Benjamin Robert Haydon. London: The Bodley Head. ISBN 9780224062473.
- Haydon, B. R. (1853). Taylor, Tom (ed.). Life of Benjamin Robert Haydon, Historical Painter, from his Autobiography and Journals. (3 vols.) (2nd ed.). London: Longman, Brown, Green, and Longmans. Vol. 1 • Vol. 2 • Vol. 3
- B. R. Haydon's Correspondence and Table Talk, with a memoir by his son, FW Haydon (2 vols., 1876)
- Elwin, Malcolm (ed.) The Autobiography and Journals of Benjamin Robert Haydon (1786-1846) (London: Macdonald, 1950)
