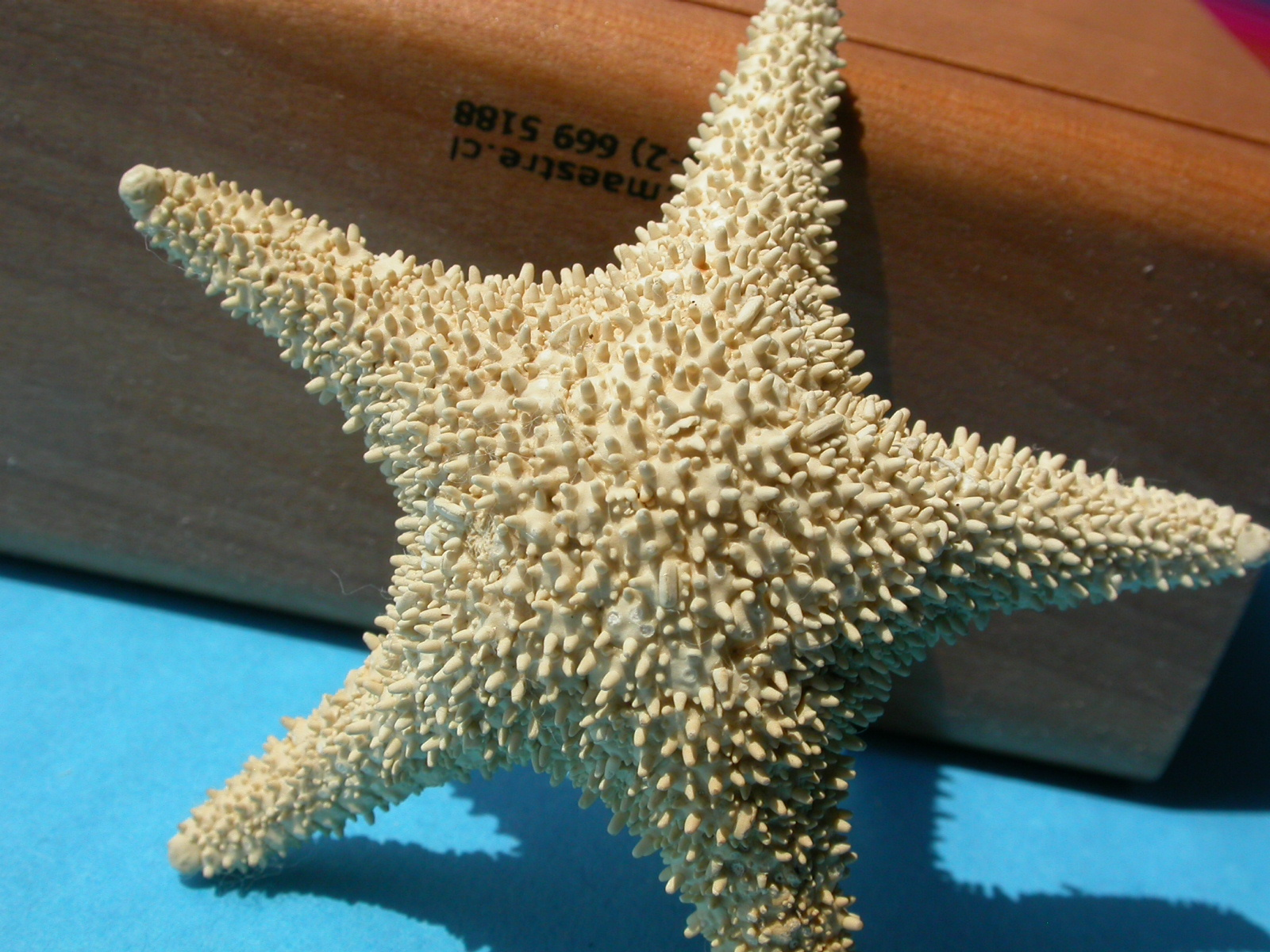
- Chitonaster trangae

Scientific classification
- Kingdom: Animalia
- Phylum: Echinodermata
- Class: Asteroidea
- Order: Valvatida
- Family: Goniasteridae
- Genus: Chitonaster; Sladen, 1889

= Chitonaster =

Genus of starfishes

Chitonaster is a genus of echinoderms belonging to the family Goniasteridae.

The species of this genus are found in the coasts of Antarctica.

Species:

- Chitonaster cataphractus Sladen, 1889
- Chitonaster felli (H.E.S.Clark, 1971)
- Chitonaster johannae Koehler, 1907
- Chitonaster trangae Mah, 2011
