= Percy Sladen =

English biologist

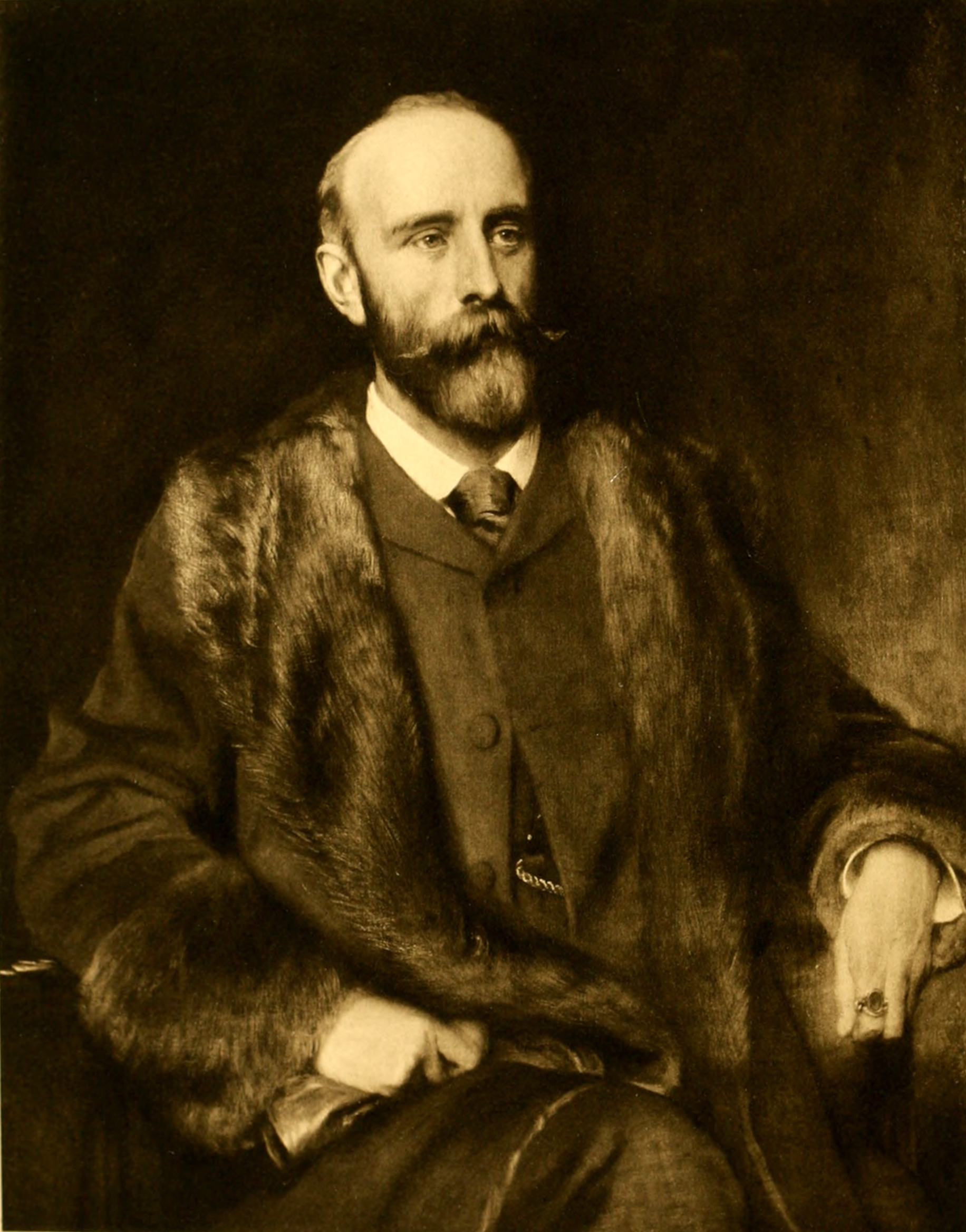
- Portrait by Henry Tanworth Wells
- Born: 30 June 1849; Halifax, United Kingdom
- Died: 11 June 1900 (aged 50); Exeter, United Kingdom
- Education: Marlborough College
- Known for: First modern classification of brittle stars
- Spouse: Constance Anderson
- Scientific career
- Fields: Zoology
- Workplaces: Linnean Society of London; Zoological Society of London; British Association for the Advancement of Science; Geological Society of London
- Author abbrev. (zoology): Sladen

Walter Percy Sladen (30 June 1849 – 11 June 1900) was an English biologist who specialised in starfish. There are over 200 accepted taxa named by him. The hatchetfish Argyropelecus sladeni was named after him.

== Biography ==
The son of a wealthy leather merchant, Sladen was born near Halifax, Yorkshire on 30 June 1849. He was educated at Hipperholme Grammar School and Marlborough College, but received no university training. As a young man he indulged in his hobby of natural history, but soon became fascinated with echinoderms. In 1876 he was elected a Fellow of the Linnean Society of London, and the following year became a Fellow of the Zoological Society of London. 1877 also saw the publication of his first paper, in which he split the sea-lily genus Poteriocrinus into four; in his lifetime, Sladen would gain a reputation as a "splitter" because of his proclivity for declaring specimens to belong to new genera or species. Late that year he began a long and fruitful collaboration with Duncan; which would see the publication of some 15 co-authored papers, many on fossils, over twelve years.

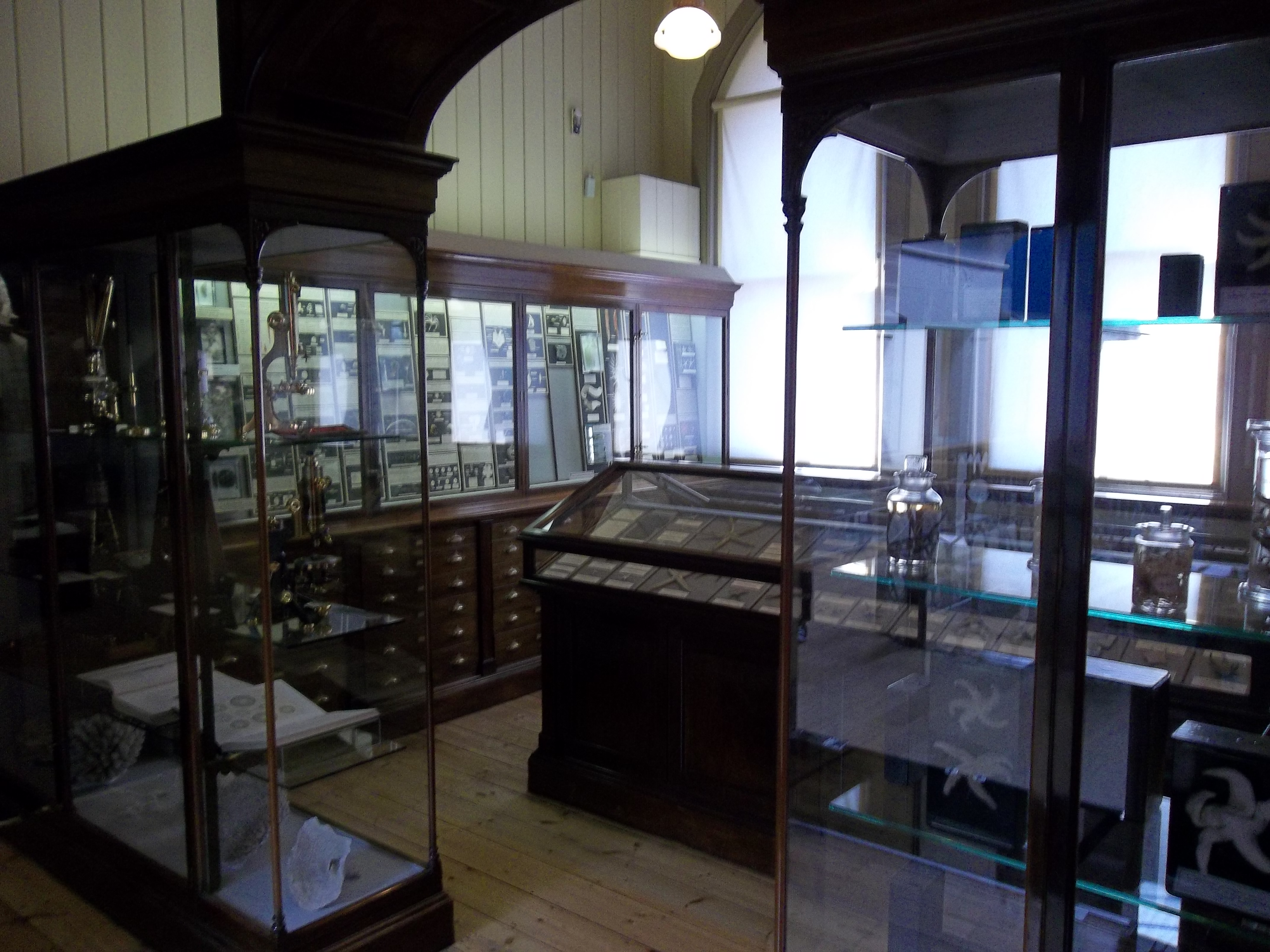
The Percy Sladen collection of echinoderms is one of the most significant outside any national collection. Royal Albert Memorial Museum, Exeter

From December 1878, Sladen spent three months at Naples under the auspices of the British Association for the Advancement of Science. His work there, on echinoderm pedicellariae, established his reputation as a leading authority on echinoderms, and in 1881 he was invited to and write up an account of the starfishes collected during the Challenger expedition. This would take him a decade to complete, and comprise nearly 1000 pages and 118 plates.

By 1890, Sladen married Constance Anderson of York. She was the sister of Tempest Anderson the volcanologist, and Yarborough Anderson, a barrister. Her father William Charles Anderson was a surgeon and Sheriff of York.

By that time Sladen was on the Committee of the British Association for the Advancement of Science, Zoological Secretary of the Linnean Society of London, and also active in the Zoological Society of London and the Geological Society of London. He therefore relocated to London, at least temporarily. Unfortunately, much of Sladen's later life was interrupted by poor health. In 1895 he was elected vice-president of the Linnean Society, but only a few months later he gave up both this and his secretarial position because of health problems. He completed only two more papers before retiring in 1898 to Northbrook, an Exeter estate inherited on the death of his uncle, John Dawson. He died there two years later, on 11 June 1900.

Following his death, Sladen's wife helped preserve her husband's memory by donating his large collection of echinoderms to the Royal Albert Memorial Museum in Exeter, and endowing the Percy Sladen Memorial Trust, to be administered by the Linnean Society to support scientific research.

== See also ==
- Category:Taxa named by Percy Sladen
