= Tempest Anderson =

British eye surgeon and volcanologist

Tempest Anderson D.Sc
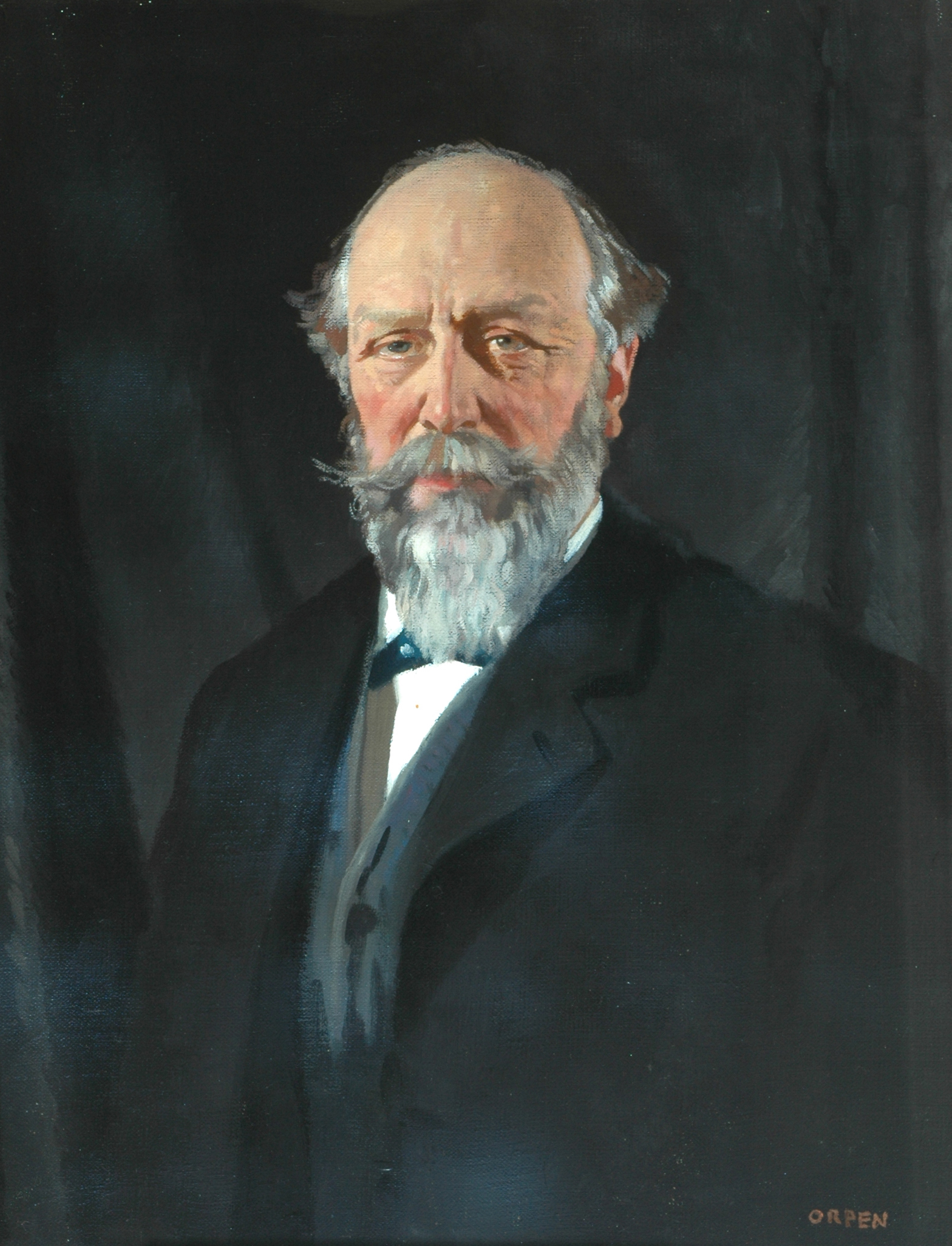
- Portrait of Tempest Anderson by Irish artist William Orpen. It currently resides in the Yorkshire Museum's Tempest Anderson Hall.
- Born: Tempest Anderson; 7 December 1846; York, England
- Died: 26 August 1913 (aged 66); Red Sea
- Education: University College London; Honorary degree from the University of Leeds
- Occupation: Ophthalmic surgeon
- Organization: President of the Yorkshire Philosophical Society
- Known for: Early amateur photography, vulcanology and gifting the Tempest Anderson Hall to the Yorkshire Philosophical Society.

Tempest Anderson (7 December 1846 – 26 August 1913) was an English ophthalmic surgeon at York County Hospital in the United Kingdom, and an expert amateur photographer and volcanologist. He was a member of the Royal Society Commission which was appointed to investigate the aftermath of the eruptions of La Soufrière volcano, St Vincent and Mont Pelée, Martinique, West Indies which both erupted in May 1902. Some of his photographs of these eruptions were subsequently published in his book, Volcanic Studies in Many Lands.

== Early life and education ==
He was born in York, was schooled at St Peter's School, York, and studied medicine at the University of London. His father was William Charles Anderson, surgeon and Sheriff of York. His sister Constance married Percy Sladen, and his brother was Yarborough Anderson, a barrister. In 1904 Anderson received an honorary degree of DSc from the University of Leeds for his work on volcanoes.

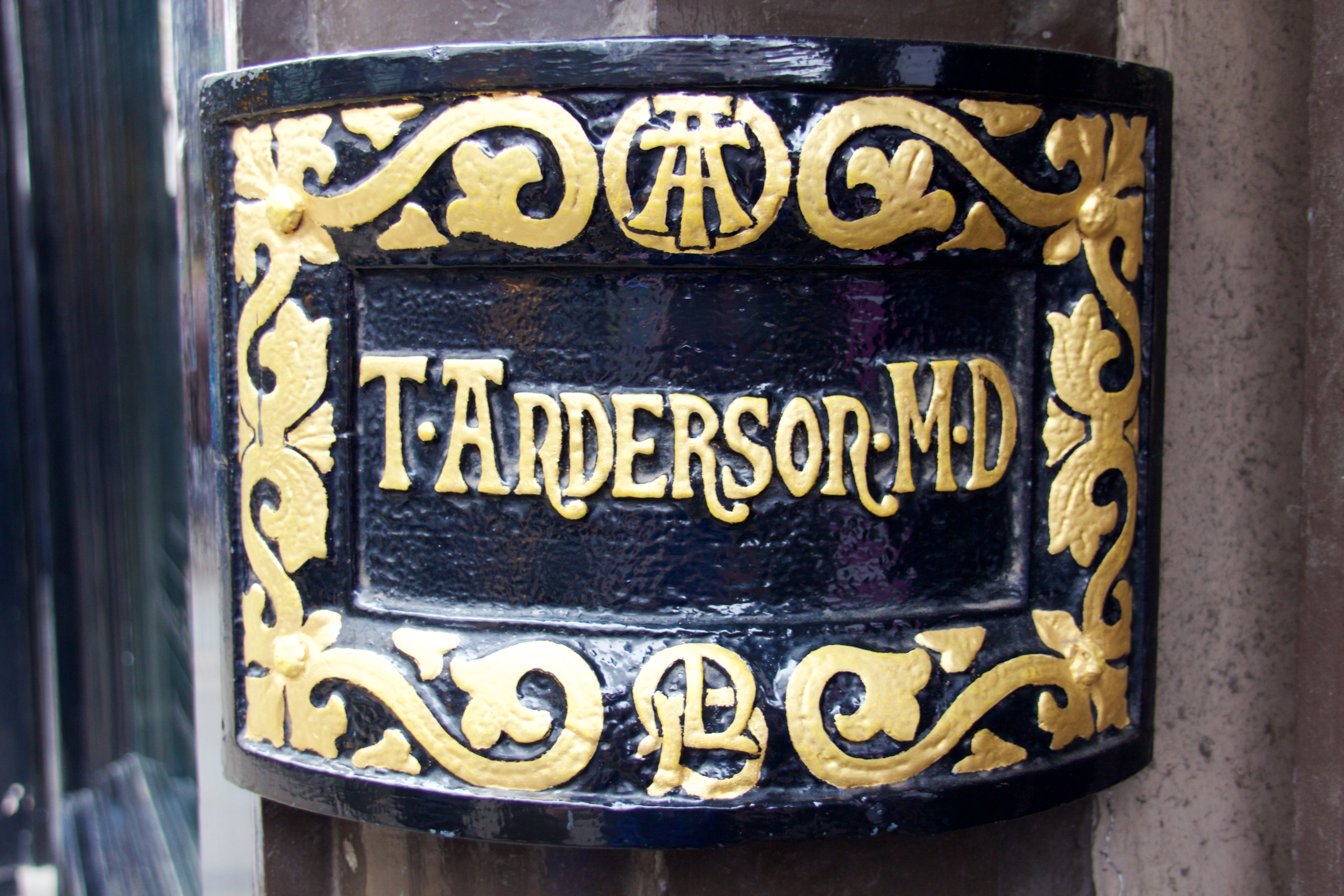
The plaque outside Anderson's house in Stonegate

Anderson lived at the family home of 17 Stonegate in the centre of York, and at 23 Stonegate, which is now the home to the York Medical Society. He built a pair of houses on the road now known as Moorgate, on land purchased from the Holgate Garden Society. In 1911 Anderson was made one of the vice-presidents of the Old Peterite Club at St Peter's School, York.

== Death and legacy ==
He was one of the five original Trustees of the Percy Sladen Memorial Trust. He was President of the Yorkshire Philosophical Society, and in 1912 he presented the society with a 300-seat lecture theatre (the Tempest Anderson Hall) attached to the Yorkshire Museum in York Museum Gardens. This was one of the world's first concrete buildings. He died on board ship on the Red Sea while returning from visiting the volcanoes of Indonesia and the Philippines. He was buried in Suez, Egypt. After his death, the houses he had built were left to his cousin, Colonel Fearnley Anderson.. He also bequeathed a substantial sum to the Yorkshire Museum. He held Telephone Number "1" in the first York Telephone Directory in 1891, published by the "National Telephone Company".

== Expeditions ==
The expeditions of Tempest Anderson
Year	Destinations	Publications	Example photograph
1883	Eifel area of Germany		
1885	Southern France (Auvergne, Ardèche, Cantal		A basalt neck at Buron near Coudes, Southern France
1888	Italy (Naples, Vesuvius, Etna, Vulcano)		
1889	Italy (Sicily, Vulcano, Stromboli), The Alps, Western Norway		
1890	Iceland		
1891	Canary Islands and Madeira		
1893	Iceland		
1894	Southern France		
1895	French Alps		
1896	Swiss and French Alps		
1898	Swiss and French Alps, Italy (Naples, Vesuvius)		
1899	Swiss Alps		
1900	Western U.S.A, Eastern U.S.A		
1901	Southern France, the Alps		
1902	West Indies (Barbados, St Vincent, Martinique, Dominica), Southern France		
1903	Egypt (?)		
1904	Egypt (?), Italy (Vesuvius, Vulcano, Stromboli)		
1905	Southern Africa (with the British Association)		
1906	Italy (Vesuvius)		
1906-1907	West Indies and Central America (Mexico, Guatemala, St Vincent, Martinique, Jamaica and Barbados)		
1909	Pacific and Western North America (Samoa, Hawaii, New Zealand, Canadian Rockies, Winnipeg)		
1910	Italy (?)		
1911	Southern France		
1913	Indonesia (Java, Krakatoa), The Philippines (died on the return voyage at Suez)		

=== Mexico, Guatemala and the West Indies ===
Tempest Anderson spent nine months in Mexico, Guatemala and the West Indies in 1906/1907. He travelled to Mexico to attend the 10th Congres Geologique International before sailing by mail steamer to Guatemala to study the effects of the 1902 earthquake. During the trip he observed and photographed Cerro Quemado, Santa Maria, and Atitlan. During this trip he collected first hand accounts of the 1902 eruption of the Santa Maria and the immediate aftermath. Captain Saunders of the Pacific Mail Steamer S.S. Newport observed the eruption cloud which rose to a great height. The Captain measured it using a sextant and recorded it as reaching 17 to 18 miles. The sounds accompanying the eruption were loud and were heard even louder at more distant places than close to the mountain. The eruption was heard as far away as Guatemala City, the noises so strong, they were assumed to come from neighbouring volcanoes.

== Publications ==
Articles

- Anderson, Tempest; John S. Flett (1903). "Report on the Eruptions of the Soufriére in St. Vincent in 1902, and on a Visit to Montagne Pelée in Martinique. Part I." Philosophical Transactions of the Royal Society of London. 200: 353–553. doi:10.1098/rsta.1903.0010. S2CID 85070450.
- Anderson, Tempest; John S. Flett (6 April 1908). "Report on the Eruptions of the Soufriére in St. Vincent in 1902, and on a Visit to Montagne Pelée in Martinique. Part II. The Changes in the Districts and the Subsequent History of the Volcanoes". Philosophical Transactions of the Royal Society of London. 80 (538): 281–284. doi:10.1098/rspa.1908.0025. JSTOR 92899.
- Darwin, Leonard; Tempest Anderson; A. E. Kitson; E. O. Thiele (July 1912). "Some New Zealand Volcanoes: Discussion". The Geographical Journal. 40 (1): 23–25. doi:10.2307/1778891. JSTOR 1778891.
- Anderson, Tempest (January 1910). "The Volcano of Matavanu in Savaii". Quarterly Journal of the Geological Society. 66 (1–4): 621–639. doi:10.1144/GSL.JGS.1910.066.01-04.30. S2CID 131149121.
- Anderson, Tempest (May 1908). "The Volcanoes of Guatemala". The Geographical Journal. 31 (5): 473–485. doi:10.2307/1777493. JSTOR 1777493.
  - Flett, John; Maudslay; Ascioli; Gehrke; Anderson, Tempest (May 1908). "The Volcanoes of Guatemala: Discussion". The Geographical Journal. 31 (5): 485–489. doi:10.2307/1777494. JSTOR 1777494.
- Anderson, Tempest (March 1903). "Recent Volcanic Eruptions in the West Indies". The Geographical Journal. 21 (3): 265–279. doi:10.2307/1775801. JSTOR 1775801.
- Anderson, Tempest (February 1912). "Volcanic Craters and Explosions". The Geographical Journal. 39 (2): 123–129. doi:10.2307/1778563. JSTOR 1778563.
- Anderson, Tempest (February 1905). "On Certain Recent Changes in the Crater of Stromboli". The Geographical Journal. 25 (2): 123–138. doi:10.2307/1775878. JSTOR 1775878.
- Anderson, Tempest (1905). "Recent changes in the crater Stromboli". The Scottish Geographical Magazine. 21 (7): 345–347. doi:10.1080/00369220508733583.
- Anderson, Tempest (11 September 1885). "The Volcanoes of Auvergne". The Report of the British Association. 55: 1017.
- Anderson, Tempest (10 September 1888). "The Volcanoes of the Two Sicilies". The Report of the British Association. 58: 663.
- Anderson, Tempest; Johnston-Lavis, H. J. (10 September 1888). "Notes on the late Eruption in the island of Vulcano". The Report of the British Association. 58: 664.
- Anderson, Tempest. "The Skaptar Jokull" (PDF). The Alpine Journal. 18: 216.
- Anderson, Tempest. "Vesuvius, the eruption of Sept. 1898" (PDF). The Alpine Journal. 19: 437.
- Anderson, Tempest. "The Grand Canon of the Colorado River" (PDF). The Alpine Journal. 20: 504.
- Anderson, Tempest. "La Coupe de Jaujac" (PDF). The Alpine Journal. 20: 504.
- Anderson, Tempest. "The volcanoes Bromo and Krakatau" (PDF). The Alpine Journal. 28: 178.
- Anderson, Tempest (1901). "A Swiss Holiday". Yorkshire Ramblers' Club Journal. 1 (3): 188–191.

Books

- Anderson, Tempest (1903). Volcanic studies in many lands : being reproductions of photographs by the author of above one hundred actual objects, with explanatory notices (1st ed.). London: John Murray. p. 444.
- Anderson, Tempest; Thomas George Bonney (1917). Volcanic studies in many lands : being reproductions of photographs by the author (2nd ed.). London: John Murray. p. 278.
