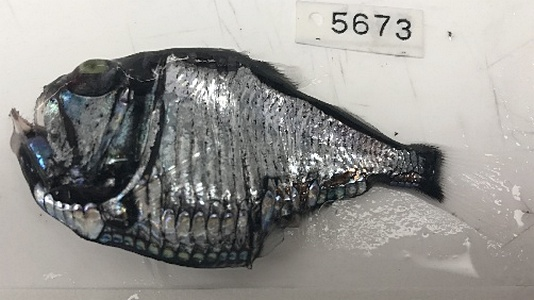

Conservation status
- Least Concern (IUCN 3.1)

Scientific classification
- Kingdom: Animalia
- Phylum: Chordata
- Class: Actinopterygii
- Order: Stomiiformes
- Family: Sternoptychidae
- Genus: Argyropelecus
- Species: A. sladeni

Binomial name
- Argyropelecus sladeni Regan, 1908

= Argyropelecus sladeni =

Sladen's hatchetfish

Species of fish

Argyropelecus sladeni, or Sladen's hatchetfish, is a species of ray-finned fish in the family Sternoptychidae, found in the tropical and subtropical Atlantic, Indian and Pacific Oceans. This small fish lives in the mesopelagic zone by day and makes a daily vertical migration to the epipelagic zone at night.

== Etymology ==
The fish is named in honor of British echinoderm biologist Percy Sladen (1849–1900) and the Percy Sladen Memorial Trust, which funded the Indian Ocean expedition that collected the type species.

== Description ==
Argyropelecus sladeni is a small, deep-bodied hatchetfish with an abdominal keel and a maximum standard length of about 60 mm (2.4 in). The mouth is of medium size, the tubular eyes point upwards, the dorsal fin has nine soft rays and is three times as long as it is high, and the adipose dorsal fin has a long base. The pectoral fins have 10 to 11 soft rays, the pelvic fins have 6 and the anal fin is in two parts, with seven soft rays in the front part and five behind. The upper pre-opercular spine is long and slopes upwards and backwards, while the lower one slopes downwards. There are two diagonally orientated post-abdominal spines, one blunt and forward pointing and the other backward pointing. The dorsal surface of the fish is dark, the flanks are silvery and there are photophores (luminous spots) on the operculum and belly.

== Distribution and habitat ==
This species has a circumglobal distribution in tropical and subtropical seas. The fish make daily vertical migrations; during the day their depth range is 350 to 600 m (1,100 to 2,000 ft) while at night it is 100 to 375 m (300 to 1,200 ft). During the day, trawls at depths between 300 and 400 m (1,000 and 1,300 ft) produce the highest catches and at night the greatest abundance of fish is in the depth range 0 to 200 m (0 to 700 ft).

== Ecology ==
Argyropelecus sladeni feed on planktonic organisms, krill, amphipods, copepods and ostracods. The species is oviparous and both eggs and larvae drift as part of the plankton.

== Status ==
A common fish, A. sladeni is abundant in many parts of its wide range. No specific threats have been identified and the International Union for Conservation of Nature has rated its conservation status as being of "least concern".
