= Linnaeus Link Project =

Linnaeus Link is an international collaboration between libraries with significant holdings of material by or relating to Carl Linnaeus (1707–1778), his students, and his legacy.

== Aims and objectives ==
The project's main aim is to provide a comprehensive online Union Catalogue of Linnaean publications, facilitating research for scholars worldwide by enabling them to identify locations of titles with a single online search and to conduct bibliographic research remotely.

In taxonomic research it is still important to reference the works of Carl Linnaeus, as he was the first to classify and describe so many species of plants and animals.

The Linnaeus Link Union Catalogue acts as the online bibliography of Linnaean works by using and continuing the bibliographic work of Basil Harrington Soulsby

The Union Catalogue is free to access and use, and to join as a partner institution. It is funded, maintained and coordinated by the Linnean Society of London.

== Scope and functionality ==
The inaugural project meeting took place in 1999, but the first version of the online Union Catalogue was not launched until 2007. In 2011-2012, the system was completely redesigned.

An important feature is the new system's ability to cope with a wide range of international cataloguing systems and special characters, in line with the project's international reach and foundations. Instead of amalgamating all individual partners' records for one title into one artificial, "ideal", record, the system uses a unique Tab display to show the full bibliographic information present in each individual record. This is especially relevant for copy-specific information and provenance research.

Another important feature is the link to digital copies where available and accessible.

== Partner institutions world-wide ==
Since the inaugural meeting in 1999, institutions world-wide have joined the project.

Partner institutions meet once a year to discuss new developments and potential new partners.

In 2015, the project included the following partner institutions:

- Botanischer Garten und Botanisches Museum Berlin-Dahlem
- British Library (London)
- Conservatoire et Jardin botaniques de la Ville de Genève
- Hagströmerbiblioteket (The Hagströmer Medico-Historical Library), Karolinska Institutet (Stockholm)
- Hunt Institute for Botanical Documentation (Pittsburgh, PA)
- Det Kongelige Bibliotek. Nationalbibliotek og Københavns universitetsbibliotek (Royal Library: National Library and Copenhagen University Library)
- Kungl. Vetenskapsakademien (Royal Swedish Academy of Sciences) (Stockholm)
- Linnean Society of London
- Muséum d'histoire naturelle de la Ville de Genève (Natural History Museum of Geneva)
- Botanic Garden Meise (formerly the National Botanic Garden of Belgium)
- Natural History Museum London
- New York Botanical Garden
- Real Jardín Botánico, Madrid (Royal Botanic Garden, Madrid)
- Royal Botanic Gardens, Kew (London)
- Royal Botanic Garden Edinburgh
- Staatsbibliothek zu Berlin, Preussischer Kulturbesitz (Germany)
- Stockholms universitetsbibliotek (Stockholm University Library)
- Svenska Linnésällskapet (Swedish Linnaeus Society) (Uppsala)
- Uppsala universitetsbibliotek (Uppsala University Library)

== Basil Soulsby's Bibliography ==
In 1933, Basil Soulsby published his bibliography of Linnaean works.

According to Soulsby's system, a unique number is assigned to each book, to each edition, to each translation, to each altered edition and each journal article, which works for items known prior to 1931, the date of publication of Soulsby's book.

== Linnaeus Link and Soulsby numbers ==
The creation of an online union catalogue of Linnaean material required that there was a common link between items held at different institutions.

The Linnaeus Link Project Team decided that the Soulsby number was the most logical link between copies. Using the Soulsby number to identify publications allows catalogue records to be replicated by participating institutions and then altered with copy-specific details.

== Post Soulsby numbers ==
There are no Soulsby numbers assigned to items published from 1931 onwards. Occasionally, it has also occurred that material published before 1931 has not been assigned a Soulsby number.

This requires assigning new or “Post Soulsby” numbers to material published from 1931 onwards or to items unlisted prior to 1931. These items are subsequently identified by a unique Post Soulsby Number. The Post Soulsby Numbers are a sequential continuation from the last Soulsby number (number 3874). Therefore, the first Post Soulsby Number is 3875.

The assignment and recording of the Post Soulsby Number sequence is maintained by the Linnaeus Link Co-ordinator at the Linnean Society of London.
