= Constance Sladen =

English artist and architectural historian

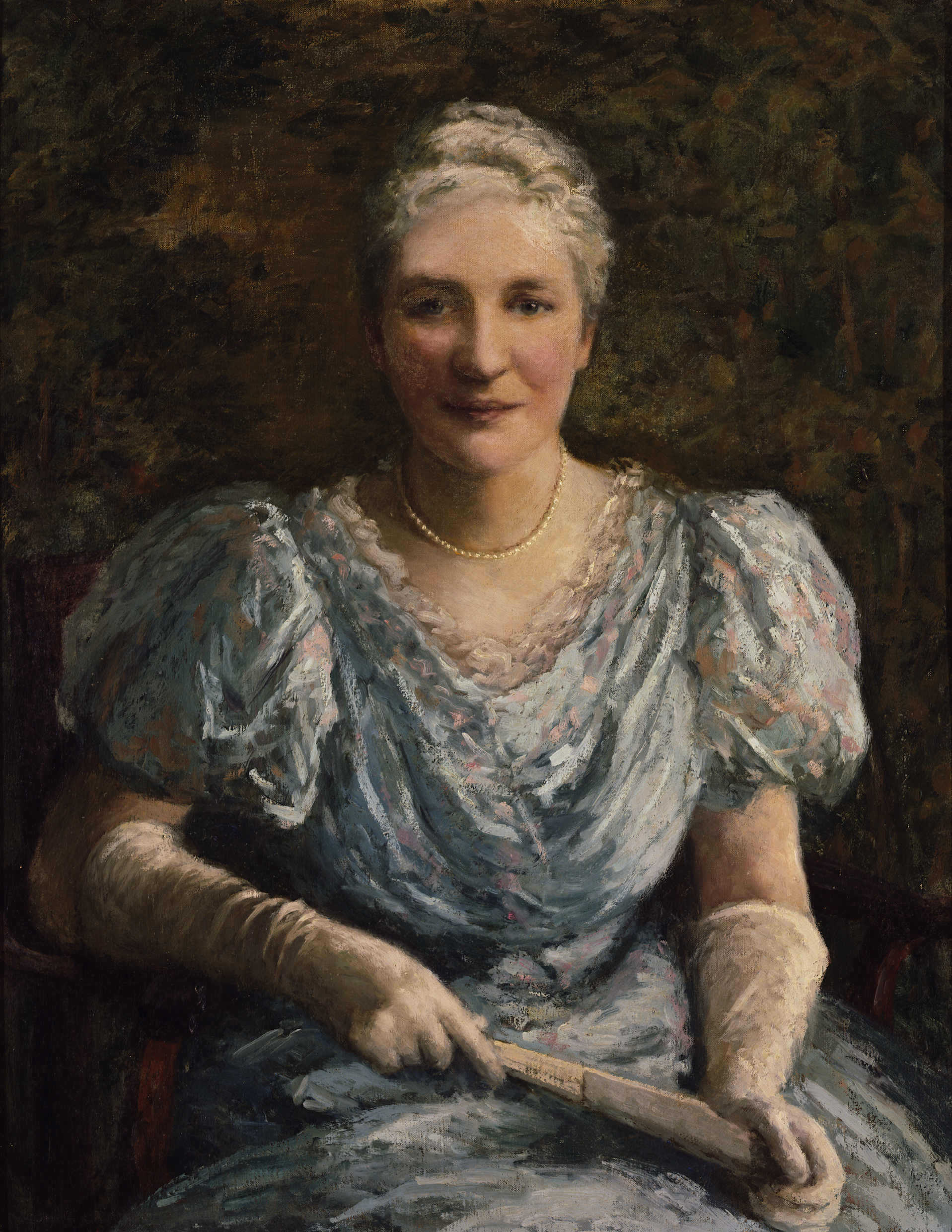
- Portrait of Sladen by Henry Tanworth Wells, 1901
- Born: Constance Anderson; 11 August 1848; York, North Yorkshire, England
- Died: 17 January 1906 (aged 57); Exeter, Devon, England
- Education: York School of Art
- Occupations: Architectural Historian; Philanthropist

Constance Sladen (11 August 1848 – 17 January 1906) was an artist, architectural historian and philanthropist who was one of the first female members of the Linnean Society of London and founded the Percy Sladen Memorial Trust in memory of her late husband.

== Biography ==
Constance Anderson was born on 11 August 1848 in York. Her father was Dr W C Anderson, Sheriff of York; her brothers were the volcanologist Tempest Anderson, and the barrister Yarborough Anderson; she had a younger sister Ellen, who became Lady Granger. She studied at York School of Art, and later in Rome.

In 1890, she married Percy Sladen, who was from a wealthy family from Halifax. They had first met around 1870. Percy Sladen was a zoologist and had a particular interest in echinoderms, creating an important collection, including specimens from the Challenger expedition. In 1898 they moved to a home, Northbrook Park, near Exeter, which Percy had inherited. His health was poor and it was hoped the new residence would improve it, however he died just two years later on a trip to Florence. Their marriage was described as "a union of heart and mind, yielding a bright and tender sympathy which strengthened and stimulated him in his life's work".

== Research interests ==
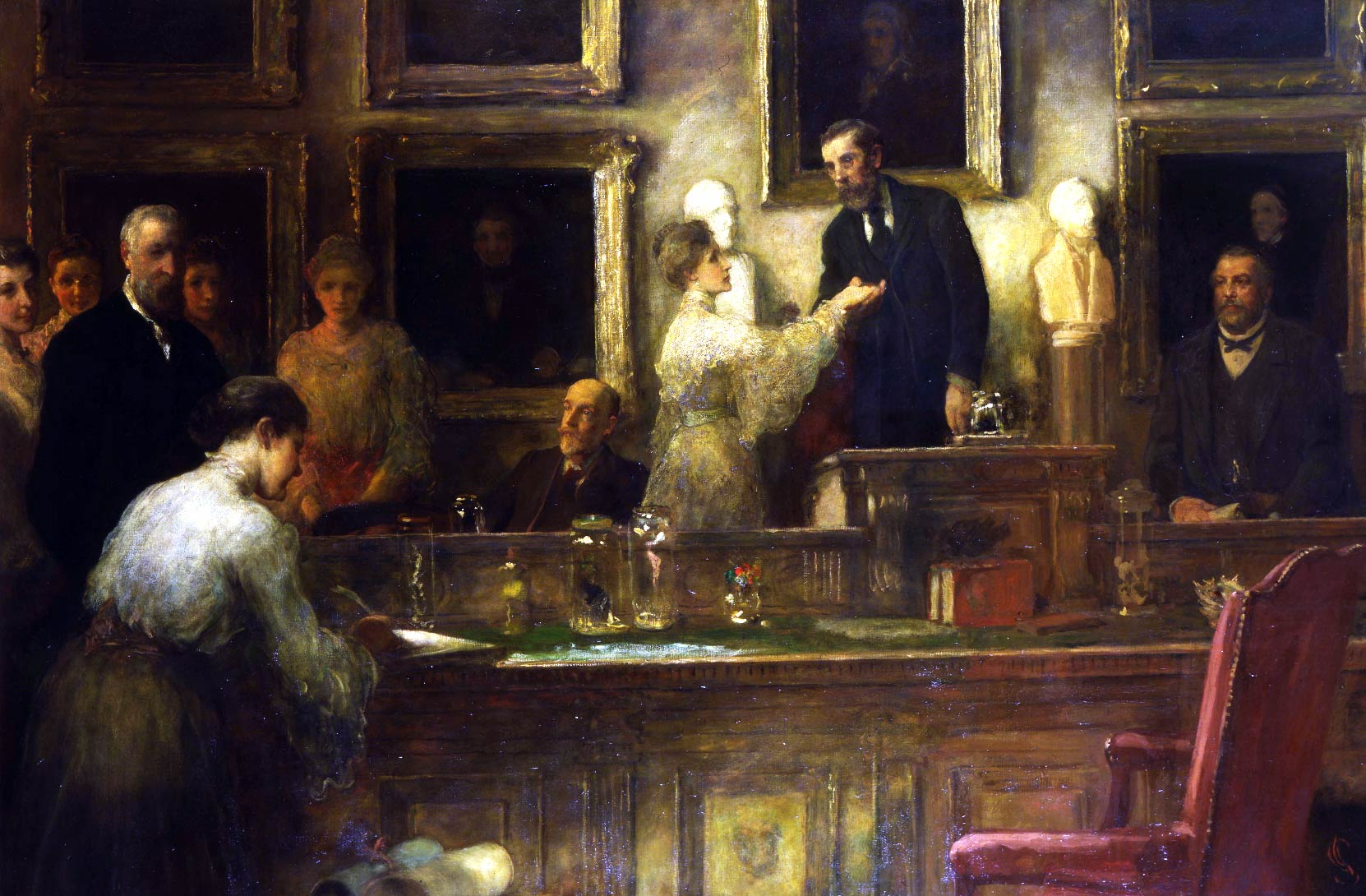
Sladen (sixth from left) depicted in "Linnean Society of London First Formal Admission of Women Fellows" by James Sant in 1906

Sladen was a notable artist and researcher, who had a keen interest in ecclesiastical architecture and archaeology, as well as natural history.

=== Art ===
Constance was a talented artist. Her pictures were exhibited in galleries in London and elsewhere. Her portrait was painted by Henry Tanworth Wells in 1901.

=== Architecture ===
Sladen was a noted authority on churches and cathedrals in Yorkshire, contributing to major works on the subject, including the section on York Minster in Cathedrals and Abbeys of England and Wales. She also wrote on the churches of Louth, Bradford and Halifax, and on Selby Abbey. She also wrote the architecture of Castle Howard.

=== Scientific interests ===
Sladen was one of the first female members of the Linnean Society in London, joining as soon as their rules on membership altered: her membership was proposed in 1904 and she entered the society as a member in 1905. She also assisted her husband in some of the classification of his collection.

== Philanthropy ==
After the death of her husband in 1900, Sladen was determined that his collection would be available for the public and endowed a new gallery and curatorial position at the Royal Albert Memorial Museum in Exeter. She also endowed the Percy Sladen Memorial Trust in 1904 to provide funding for fieldwork for biologists and geologists around the world.

Sladen died at Northbrook Park on 17 January 1906; an attack of influenza the previous year meant her health had declined. She died, according to the Linnean Society of an "obscure disease" after some months of illness. She is buried with her husband in the graveyard at St Luke's Church in Exeter.

== Legacy ==
After her death, Sladen was described as "a great benefactor of science" by the Linnean Society. She features in the portrait by James Sant showing Linnean Society of London: First Formal Admission of Women Fellows, painted in 1906. She is the standing figure centre-left in the portrait.

=== Eponyms ===
Two species are named after Constance Sladen as a result of her philanthropic work. The white-bellied woolly mouse opossum (Marmosa constantiae) was named by Oldfield Thomas in honour of her financing the expedition by Alphonse Robert which collected the type specimen in 1902. The Fernando Po swift (Apus sladeniae), a bird, was also named after Sladen, who provided financial support for its discovery.
