= Volunteers at a Firing Point =

Painting by Henry Tanworth Wells

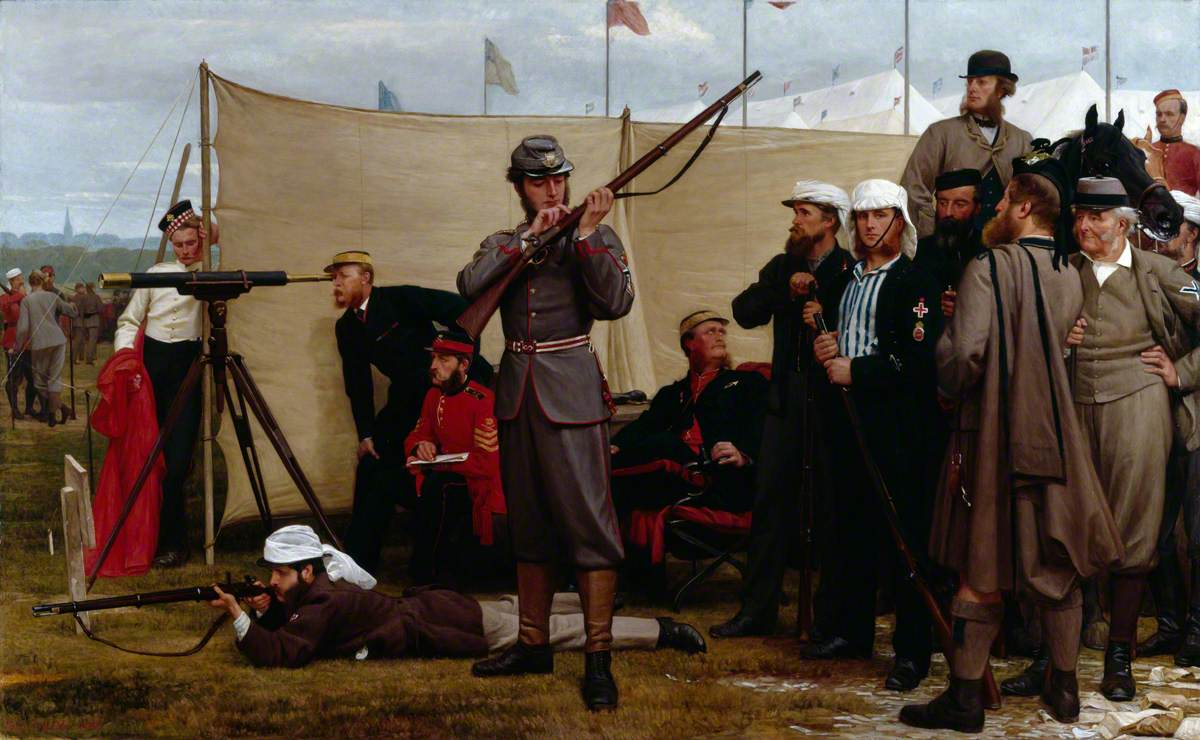
- Artist: Henry Tanworth Wells
- Year: 1866
- Type: Oil on canvas, genre painting
- Dimensions: 182.4 cm × 292.3 cm (71.8 in × 115.1 in)
- Location: Royal Academy of Arts, London

Volunteers at a Firing Point is an 1866 oil painting by the British artist Henry Tanworth Wells. It depicts members of the Volunteers assembled on Wimbledon Common, then to the south of London. It combines elements of genre painting and portraiture. When he displayed the work at the Royal Academy Exhibition of 1866 at the National Gallery, the catalogue listed the various figures depicted.

In 1882, after Wells was elected to full membership of the Royal Academy of Arts, he was required to submit a diploma work and presented this painting.

== Bibliography ==
- Carlisle, Janice. Picturing Reform in Victorian Britain. Cambridge University Press, 2012.
- Herrington, Katie J.T. Victorian Artists and Their World 1844-1861. Boydell Press, 2024.
