= Victoria Regina (painting) =

Painting by Henry Tanworth Wells

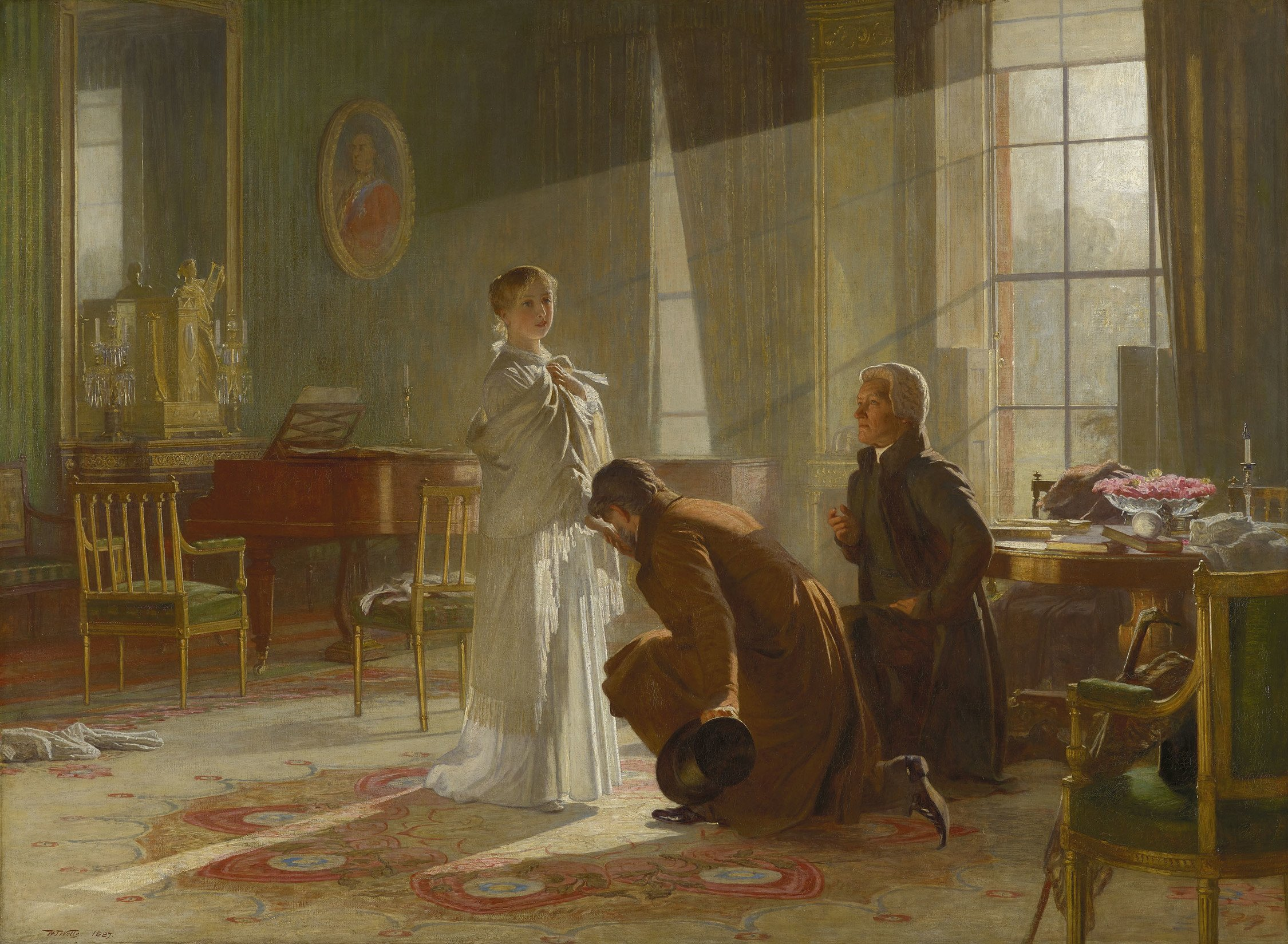
- Artist: Henry Tanworth Wells
- Year: 1887
- Type: Oil on canvas, history painting
- Dimensions: 311 cm × 420 cm (122.5 in × 165.5 in)
- Location: Royal Collection

Victoria Regina is an 1887 history painting by the British artist Henry Tanworth Wells featuring the beginning of the Victorian era. It depicts the scene in 1837 when the eighteen year old Queen Victoria is informed that she has succeeded to the throne following the death of her uncle William IV. She was awakened early in the morning at Kensington Palace by the Lord Chamberlain Lord Conyngham and the Archbishop of Canterbury William Howley who kneel as they deliver the news. It is also known by the subtitle Queen Victoria receiving the news of her Accession.

It was produced for the fiftieth anniversary of her accession, celebrated as the Golden Jubilee of Queen Victoria. Although not commissioned by Victoria herself, instead being based on a passage Wells had read in the diaries of Frances Williams-Wynn. In the background is a portrait of Victoria's late father Duke of Kent.

An earlier version of the scene had been produced in 1880 when it was displayed at the Royal Academy Exhibition of 1880, with a significantly different background, which is now in the Tate Britain. The second version was acquired for the Royal Collection when it was presented to Edward VII in 1903 by the artist's daughters.

== Bibliography ==
- Homans, Margaret & Munich, Adrienne. Remaking Queen Victoria. Cambridge University Press, 1997.
- Murphy, Deidre. The Young Victoria. Yale University Press, 2019.
- Plunkett, John. Queen Victoria: First Media Monarch. Oxford University Press, 2003.
