= Percy Sladen Trust Expeditions to the Abrolhos Islands =

The Percy Sladen Trust Expeditions to the Abrolhos Islands were two scientific expeditions, conducted in 1913 and 1915 under the leadership of Professor William John Dakin and funded by the Percy Sladen Trust. These expeditions conducted extensive research into the natural history of the Houtman Abrolhos, an archipelago in the Indian Ocean off the coast of Western Australia.

The first expedition lasted for three weeks from November 1913; the expedition members were Dakin and Wilfred Alexander. The pair undertook shore collecting, biological observations on various islands, some geological observations, and dredging in the lagoons and between the island groups. The resultant collections and observations were sufficiently important to warrant a second visit, and accordingly a second expedition was funded. The second expedition lasted for four weeks from October 1915; this time Dakin's companion was A. Cayzer. More hydrographic equipment was carried the second time, and a great deal of time was spent in dredging.

The Percy Sladen Trust expeditions were only the second scientific expeditions to the islands, the first being a visit by William Saville-Kent in the 1890s. The expeditions ultimately contributed substantially to published information on the biota of the archipelago. Publications that stemmed from the expedition are as follows:

- Dakin, W. J. (1916). "A new species of Enteropneusta Ptychodera pelsarti from the Abrolhos Islands". Zoological Journal of the Linnean Society. 33 (222): 85–98. doi:10.1111/j.1096-3642.1916.tb00254.x.
- Dakin, W. J.; Dakin, W. J. (1919). "The Percy Sladen Trust Expeditions to the Abrolhos Islands (Indian Ocean): Report I: Introduction, general description of the coral islands forming the Houtman Abrolhos group, the formation of the islands". Zoological Journal of the Linnean Society. 34 (226): 127–180. doi:10.1111/j.1096-3642.1919.tb01784.x.
- Alexander, W. B. (1922). "The vertebrate fauna of Houtman's Abrolhos (Abrolhos Islands), Western Australia". Zoological Journal of the Linnean Society. 34 (230): 457–486. doi:10.1111/j.1096-3642.1922.tb01841.x.
- Fauvel, P. (1922). "Annelides polychaetes d'l'Archipelago Houtman Abrolhos (Australia Occidentale) recuillies par M. le Prof. W. J. Dakin, F.L.S". Zoological Journal of the Linnean Society. 34 (230): 487–500. doi:10.1111/j.1096-3642.1922.tb01843.x.
- Tattersall, W. M. (1922). "Amphipoda and Isopoda: Percy Sladen Trust expedition to the Abrolhos Islands (Indian Ocean)". Zoological Journal of the Linnean Society. 35 (231): 1–19. doi:10.1111/j.1096-3642.1922.tb01493.x.
- Clark, H. L. (1923). "Some echinoderms from Western Australia". Zoological Journal of the Linnean Society. 35 (234): 229–251. doi:10.1111/j.1096-3642.1923.tb00047.x.
- Dendy, A.; Frederick, Leslie M. (1924). "On a collection of sponges from the Abrolhos Islands, Western Australia". Zoological Journal of the Linnean Society. 35 (237): 477–519. doi:10.1111/j.1096-3642.1924.tb00052.x.
- O'Donoghue, C. H. (1924). "Report on Opisthobrancia from the Abrolhos Islands, Western Australia, with a description of a new parasitic copepod". Zoological Journal of the Linnean Society. 35 (237): 521–579. doi:10.1111/j.1096-3642.1924.tb00053.x.
- Thorpe, C. (1928). "Alcyonaria of the Abrolhos Islands, Western Australia". Zoological Journal of the Linnean Society. 36 (247): 479–531. doi:10.1111/j.1096-3642.1928.tb02181a.x.
- Montgomery, S. K. (1931). "Report on the crustacean Brachyura of the Percy Sladen Trust expedition to the Abrolhos Islands under the leadership of Professor W. J. Dakin D.Sc., F.L.S., in 1913, along with other crabs from Western Australia". Zoological Journal of the Linnean Society. 37 (253): 405–465. doi:10.1111/j.1096-3642.1931.tb00470.x.

Despite this large list of papers, not all of the collected specimens were written up; for example, of the molluscs collected, only the opisthobranchs were written up.
