= Linnean Society of London =

Learned society for the study and dissemination of taxonomy and natural history

The Linnean Society of London
- Formation: 1788; 238 years ago (royal charter: 1802)
- Type: Learned society
- Purpose: Natural History, Evolution & Taxonomy
- Location(s): Burlington House, Piccadilly; London, W1
- Members: 3,168 (as of 2023)
- President: Mark Watson
- Website: www.linnean.org
- Remarks: Motto: Naturae Discere Mores ("To Learn the Ways of Nature")

The Linnean Society of London is a learned society dedicated to the study and dissemination of information concerning natural history, evolution, and taxonomy. It possesses several important biological specimen, manuscript and literature collections, and publishes academic journals and books on plant and animal biology. The society also awards a number of prestigious medals and prizes. Fellowship of the Linnean Society is regarded as a significant professional distinction and mark of excellence in the scientific and academic community, recognising expertise and notable contributions to the natural sciences. Fellows are entitled to use the post-nominals FLS.

A product of the 18th-century enlightenment, the society is the oldest extant biological society in the world and is historically important as the venue for the first public presentation of the theory of evolution by natural selection on 1 July 1858.

The patron of the society is Anne, Princess Royal. Vice-patrons include: Emeritus Emperor Akihito of Japan, King Carl XVI Gustaf of Sweden (both have active interests in natural history), and the eminent naturalist and broadcaster Sir David Attenborough.

== History ==
=== Founding ===
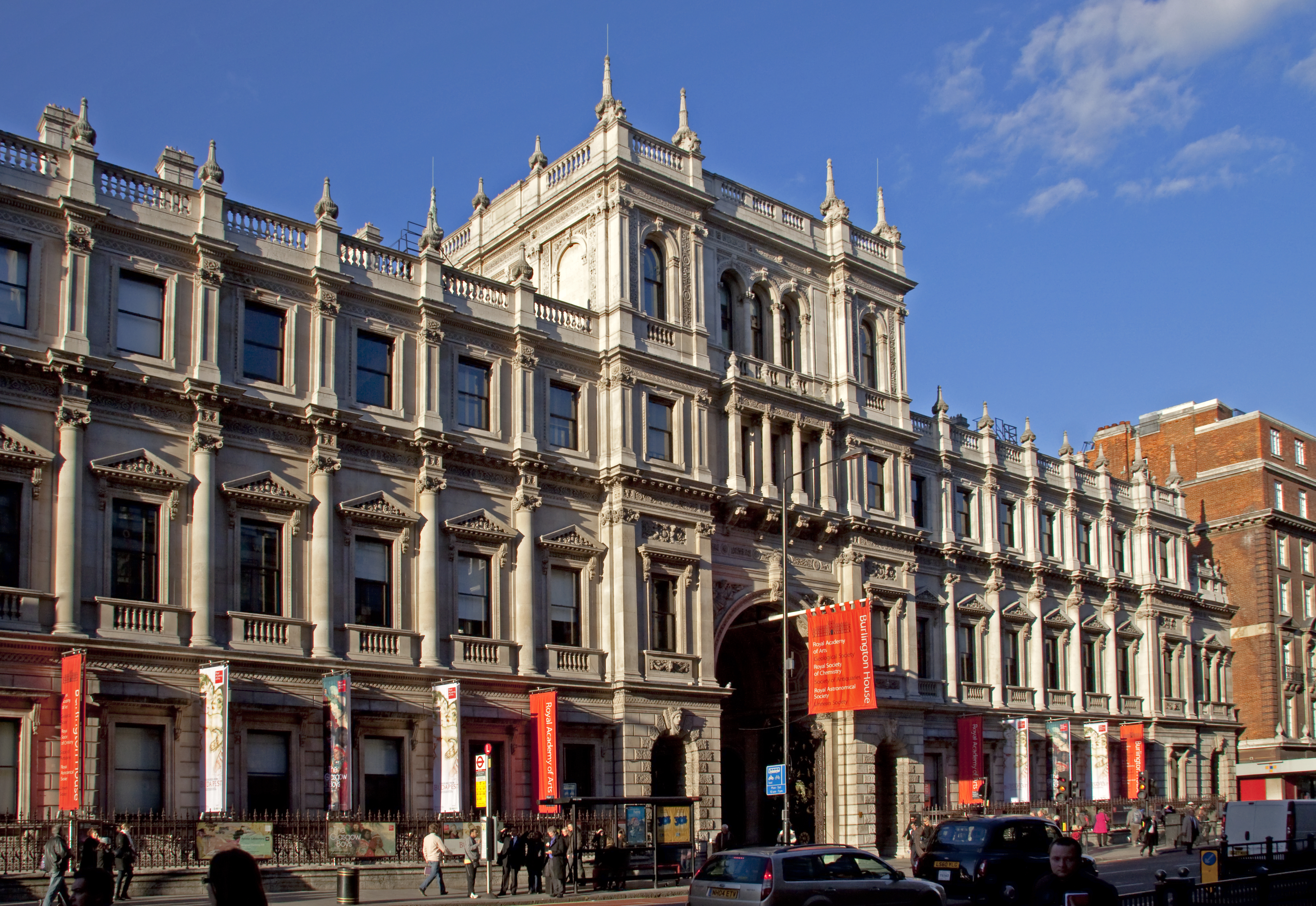
Burlington House: the Linnean Society occupies the range to the left of, and above, the entrance arch

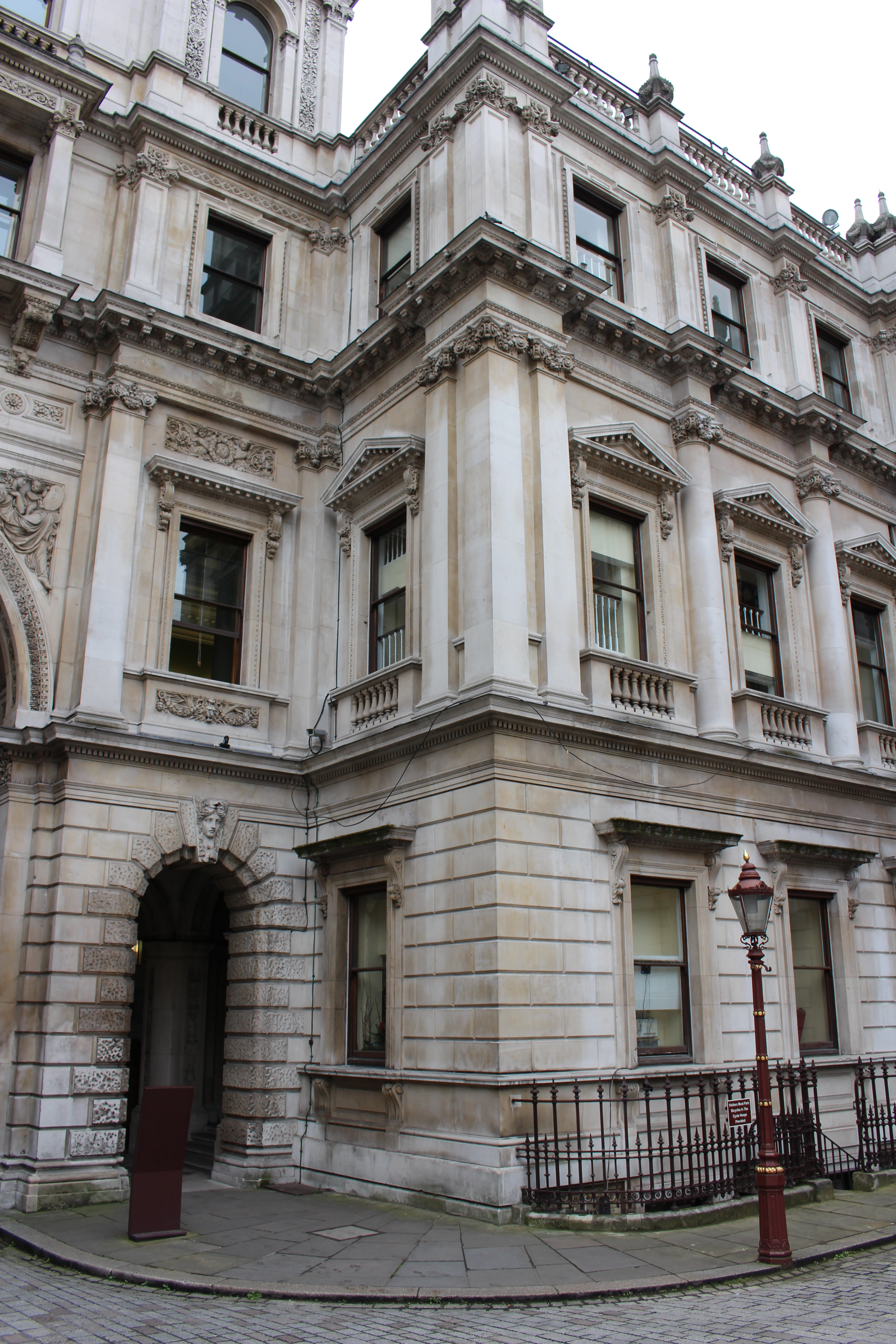
The society's premises in Burlington House seen from within the courtyard

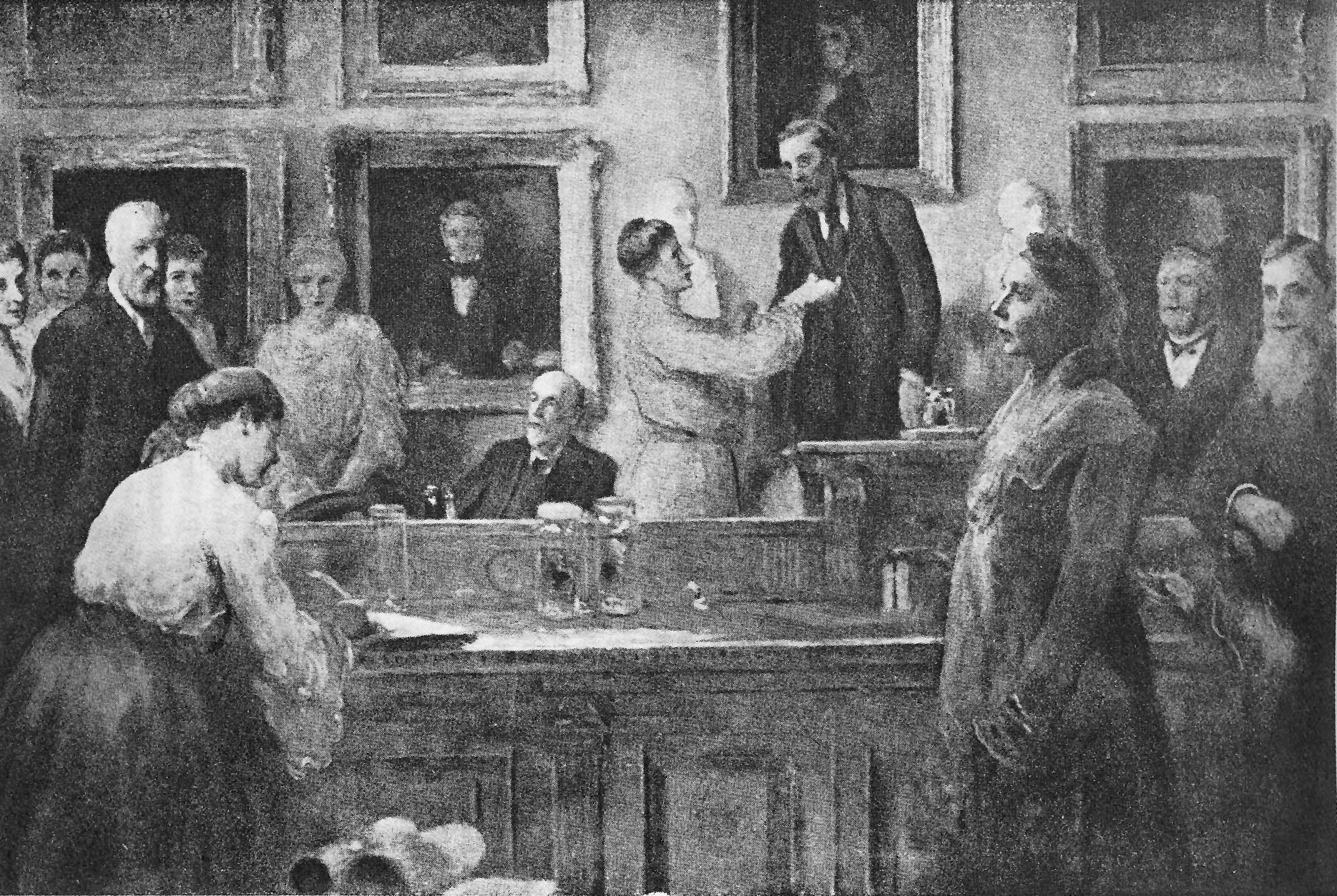
The first admission of women as fellows of the society in 1905 (original version), Emma Louisa Turner is on the far left, Lilian J. Veley is shown signing the membership book, whilst Lady Crisp receives the 'hand of Fellowship' from the president, William Abbott Herdman, behind Lilian J. Veley and standing is Constance Sladen – from a painting by James Sant (1820–1916) held by The Linnean Society of London

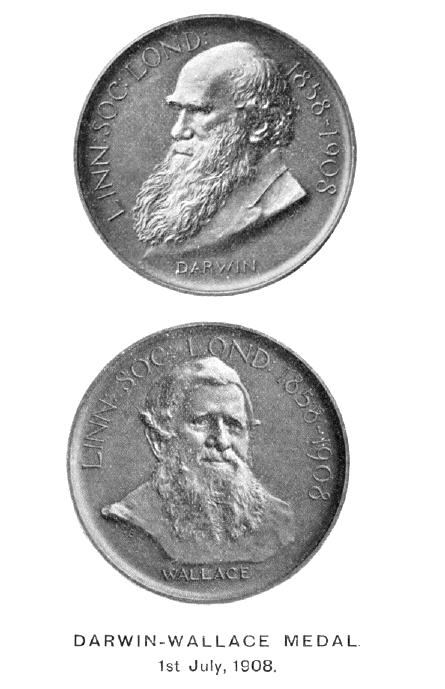

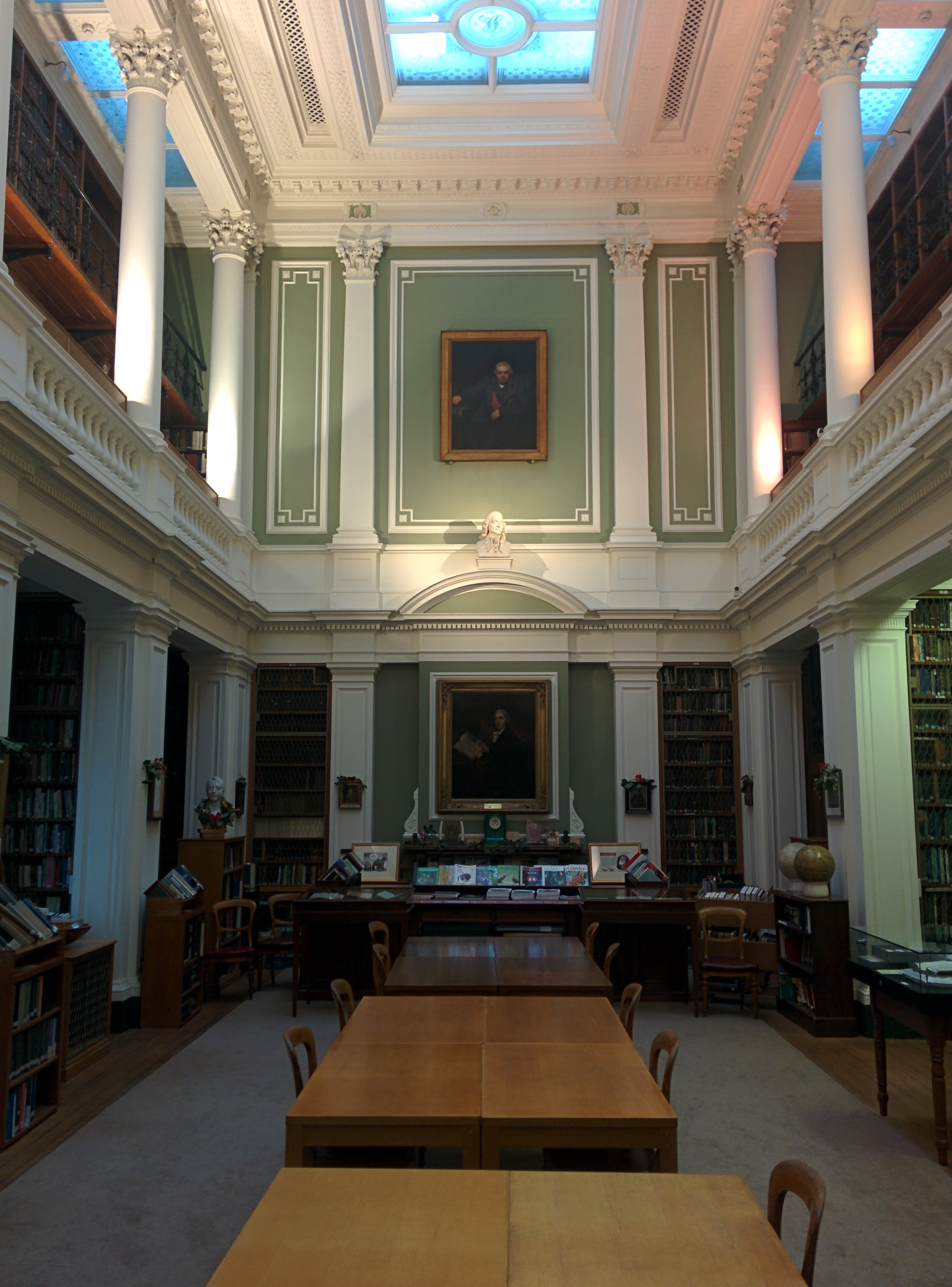
The library of the Linnean Society, Burlington House

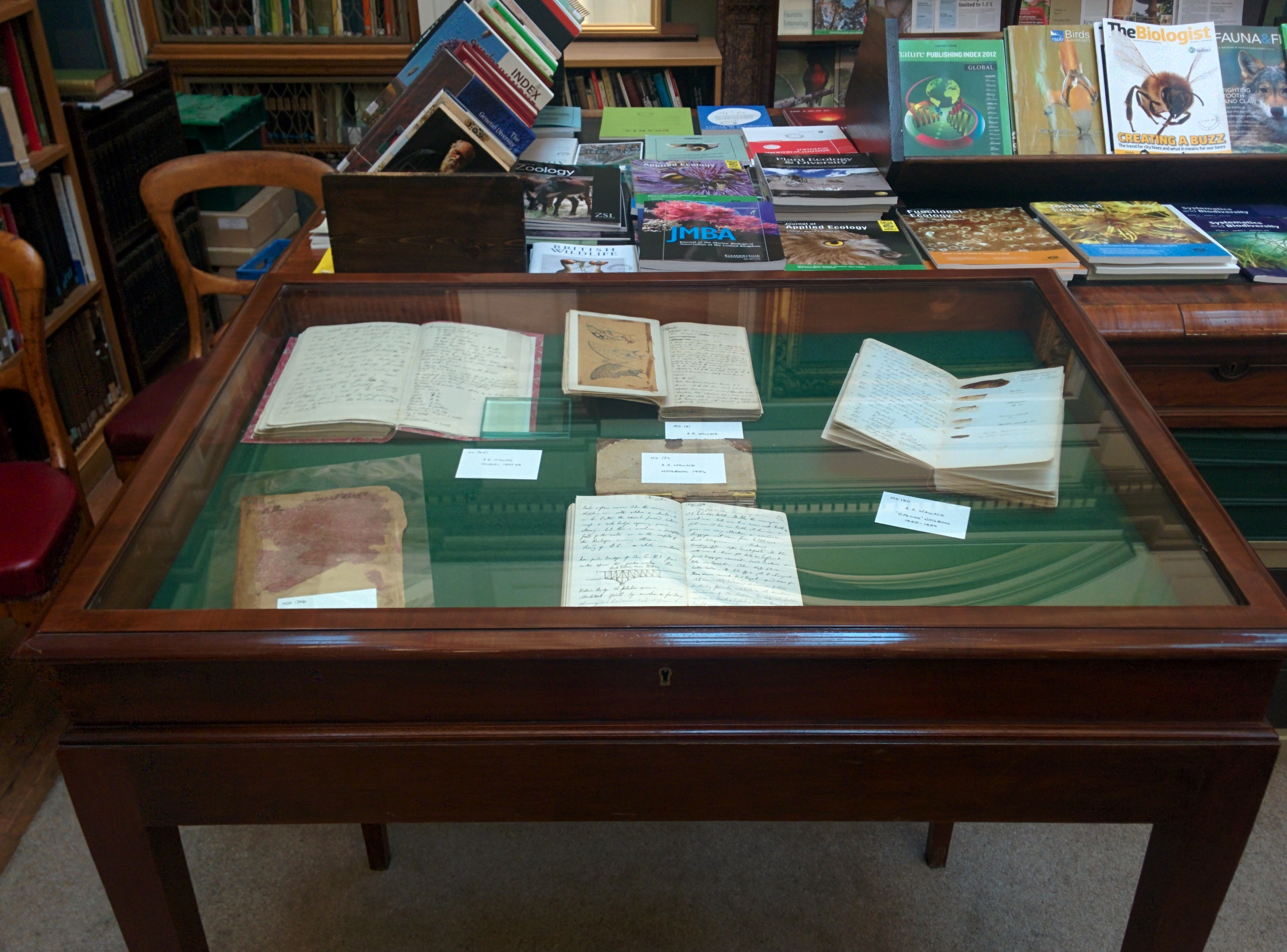
A display of Alfred Russel Wallace notebooks in the Linnean Society library

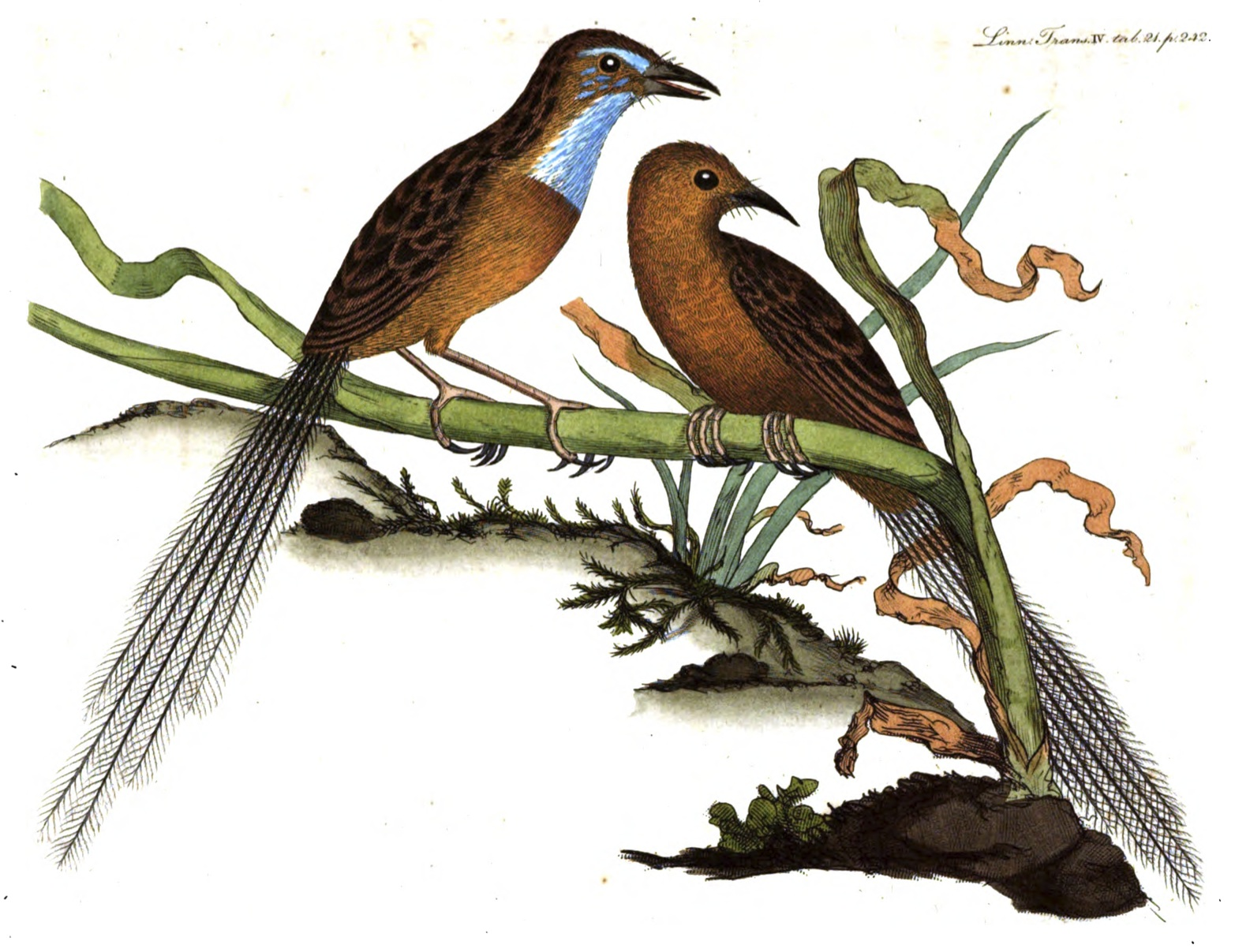
Muscicapa malachura (the Southern emu-wren), a new species from New South Wales, by Thomas Davies, 1798, Transactions of the Linnean Society of London, Volume 4, facing page 242

The Linnean Society was founded in 1788 by botanist Sir James Edward Smith. The society takes its name from the Swedish naturalist Carl Linnaeus, the 'father of taxonomy', who systematised biological classification through his binomial nomenclature. (He was known as Carl von Linné after his ennoblement, hence the spelling 'Linnean', rather than 'Linnaean'.) The society had a number of minor name variations before it gained its Royal Charter on 26 March 1802, when the name became fixed as "The Linnean Society of London". As a newly incorporated society, it comprised 228 fellows. It is the oldest extant natural history society in the world. Throughout its history the society has been a non-political and non-sectarian institution, existing solely for the furtherance of natural history.

The inception of the society was the direct result of the purchase by Sir James Edward Smith of the specimen, book and correspondence collections of Carl Linnaeus. When the collection was offered for sale by Linnaeus's heirs, Smith was urged to acquire it by Sir Joseph Banks, the eminent botanist and president of the Royal Society. Five years after this purchase Banks gave Smith his full support in founding the Linnean Society, and became one of its first Honorary Members.

=== Prominent members ===
The society has numbered many prominent scientists amongst its fellows. One such was the botanist Robert Brown, who was librarian, and later president (1849–1853); he named the cell nucleus and discovered Brownian motion. In 1854, Charles Darwin was elected a fellow; he is undoubtedly the most illustrious scientist ever to appear on the membership rolls of the society. Another famous fellow was biologist Thomas Huxley, who would later gain the nickname "Darwin's bulldog" for his outspoken defence of Darwin and evolution. Men notable in other walks of life have also been fellows of the society, including the physician Edward Jenner, pioneer of vaccination, the Arctic explorers Sir John Franklin and Sir James Clark Ross, colonial administrator and founder of Singapore, Sir Thomas Stamford Raffles and Prime Minister of the United Kingdom, Lord Aberdeen.

=== Biological evolution and the society ===
The first public exposition of the 'Theory of Evolution by Natural Selection', arguably the greatest single leap of progress made in biology, was presented to a meeting of the Linnean Society on 1 July 1858. At this meeting a joint presentation of papers by Charles Darwin and Alfred Russel Wallace was made, sponsored by Joseph Hooker and Charles Lyell, as neither author could be present.

The society's connection with evolution remained strong into the 20th century. Sir Edward Poulton, who was president in 1912–1916, was a great defender of natural selection, and was the first biologist to recognise the importance of frequency-dependent selection.

=== Female fellows ===
In 1904, the society elected its first female fellows, following a number of years of tireless campaigning by the botanist Marian Farquharson. Whilst the society's council was reluctant to admit women, the wider fellowship was more supportive; only 17% voted against the proposal. Among the first to benefit from this were the ornithologist and photographer Emma Louisa Turner, Lilian J. Veley, a microbiologist, Annie Lorrain Smith, a lichenologist and mycologist, Gulielma Lister, a mycologist, and Margaret Jane Benson, a paleobotanist, all formally admitted on 19 January 1905.

Also numbered in the first cohort of women to be elected in 1904 were: the paleobotanist, and later pioneer of family planning, Marie Stopes, the philanthropist Constance Sladen, founder of the Percy Sladen Memorial Trust and Alice Laura Embleton (1876–1960), biologist, zoologist and suffragist, who had been one of the earliest women to deliver a paper to the society on 4 Jun 1903. Overall, 15 out of 16 women nominated in 1904 were elected to the society. Marian Farquharson was not admitted, having been "shamefully blackballed" as the society now states, although she was finally admitted in 1908.

The painting "Admission of Lady Fellows" by James Sant R.A., which hangs on the upper staircase, shows the eleven women signing the society's Book of Admission and Obligation on 19 January 1905. The painting was altered to remove the figures of T R R Stebbing, the Zoological Secretary, and his wife, Mary Anne, from the right hand side sometime before the painting was presented to the society in 1919. The first female president of the society was Irene Manton (1973 to 1976), who pioneered the biological use of electron microscopy. Her work revealed the structure of the flagellum and cilia, which are central to many systems of cellular motility.

=== Present interests ===
Recent years have seen an increased interest within the society in issues of biodiversity conservation. This was highlighted by the inception in 2015 of an annual award, the John Spedan Lewis Medal, specifically honouring persons making significant and innovative contributions to conservation.

== Locations ==
The society has had a number of different homes, initially meeting in Marlborough Coffee House (1788), before moving to Panton Square in 1795, then Gerrard Street, Soho in 1805, and Soho Square in 1821. Since 1857 the society has been based at Burlington House, Piccadilly, London; an address it shares with a number of other learned societies: the Geological Society of London, the Royal Astronomical Society, the Society of Antiquaries of London and the Royal Society of Chemistry.

In April 1939 the threat of war obliged the society to relocate the Linnean collections out of London to Woburn Abbey in Bedfordshire, where they remained for the duration of World War II. This move was facilitated by the 12th Duke of Bedford, a Fellow of the Linnean Society himself. Three thousand of the most precious items from the library collections were packed up and evacuated to Oxford; the country house of librarian Warren Royal Dawson provided a refuge for the society's records.

== Membership ==
Fellowship is open to both professional scientists and to amateur naturalists who have shown active interest in natural history and allied disciplines. Having authored relevant publications is an advantage, but not a necessity, for election. Prior to November 2024, fellowship required nomination by at least one fellow, and election by a minimum of two-thirds of those electors voting. Following election, new fellows had to be formally admitted, in person at a meeting of the society, before they were able to vote in society elections. Admission took the form of signing the membership book, and thereby agreeing to an obligation to abide by the statutes of the society. Following this the new fellow was taken by the hand by the president, who recited a formula of admission to the fellowship.

Other forms of membership exist: 'Associate' (or 'ALS'), for supporters of the society who do not wish to submit to the formal election process for fellowship, and 'Student Associate', for those registered as students at a place of tertiary education. Associate members may apply for election to the fellowship at any time.

The Linnean Society’s Council may, from time to time, invite persons who champion and support the object of the Society to accept the role of Vice-Patron of the Society. The role of Vice-Patron was established in November 2024 when the Society’s revised Charter and Bye-Laws became operational. Vice-Patrons were previously known as Honorary Members.

Since November 2024, applications for fellowship are considered by the Fellowship Committee. Existing fellows may make a formal objection to the admittance of any prospective fellow. Election to fellowship is via an application supported by named referees. The fellowship committee reports to the council of the society on the suitability of applicants. After approval at a society meeting, applicants will be deemed elected as fellows. Fellows may employ the post-nominal letters 'FLS'. Honorary Fellows are limited to 75 in number and nominated by the Society’s Council for election by the Society’s Fellowship.

The role of Honorary Fellow was established in May 2025 following the Society’s revised Charter and Bye-Laws becoming operational in November 2024. Honorary Fellows were previously known as Fellows honoris causa for British subjects, or Foreign Members for non-British subjects.

== Meetings ==
Meetings have historically been, and continue to be, the main justification for the society's existence. Meetings are venues for people of like interests to exchange information, talk about scientific and literary concerns, exhibit specimens, and listen to lectures. Today, meetings are held in the evening and also at lunchtime. Most are open to the general public as well as to members.

On or near 24 May, traditionally regarded as the birthday of Carl Linnaeus, the Anniversary Meeting is held. This is for fellows and guests only, it includes ballots for membership of the council of the society and the awarding of medals. On 22 May 2020, for the first time in its history, the Anniversary Meeting was held online via videotelephony. This was due to restrictions on public gatherings imposed in response to the COVID-19 pandemic.

== Medals and prizes ==
The Linnean Society of London aims to promote the study of all aspects of the biological sciences, with particular emphasis on evolution, taxonomy, biodiversity, and sustainability. Through awarding medals and grants, the society acknowledges and encourages excellence in all of these fields.

The following medals and prizes are awarded by the Linnean Society:

- Linnean Medal, established 1888, awarded annually to alternately a botanist or a zoologist or (as has been common since 1958) to one of each in the same year.
- Darwin-Wallace Medal, first awarded in 1908, for major advances in evolutionary biology.
- H. H. Bloomer Award, established 1963 from a legacy by the amateur naturalist Harry Howard Bloomer, awarded to "an amateur naturalist who has made an important contribution to biological knowledge"
- Trail-Crisp Award, established in 1966 from the amalgamation of two previous awards – both dating to 1910 – awarded "in recognition of an outstanding contribution to biological microscopy that has been published in the UK".
- Bicentenary Medal, established 1978, on the 200th anniversary of the death of Linnaeus, "in recognition of work done by a person under the age of 40 years".
- Jill Smythies Award, established 1986, awarded for botanical illustrations.
- Linnean Gold Medal, For services to the society – awarded in exceptional circumstances, from 1988.
- Irene Manton Prize, established 1990, for the best dissertation in botany during an academic year.
- Linnean Tercentenary Medal, awarded in 2007 in celebration of the three hundredth anniversary of the birth of Linnaeus.
- John C Marsden Medal, established 2012, for the best doctoral thesis in biology examined during a single academic year.
- John Spedan Lewis Medal, established 2015, awarded to "an individual who is making a significant and innovative contribution to conservation".
- Sir David Attenborough Award for Fieldwork, established in 2015.

== Collections ==
Linnaeus' botanical and zoological collections were purchased in 1783 by Sir James Edward Smith, the first president of the society, and are now held in London by the society. The collections include 14,000 plants, 158 fish, 1,564 shells, 3,198 insects, 1,600 books and 3,000 letters and documents. They may be viewed by appointment and there is a monthly tour of the collections.

Smith's own plant collection of 27,185 dried specimens, together with his correspondence and book collection, is also held by the society.

Other notable holdings of the society include the notebooks and journals of Alfred Russel Wallace and the paintings of plants and animals made by Francis Buchanan-Hamilton (1762-1829) in Nepal.

In December 2014, the society's specimen, library, and archive collections were granted designated status by the Arts Council England, recognising collections of national and international importance (one of only 152 institutions so recognised as of 2020).

== Publications ==
The Linnean Society began its extensive series of publications on 13 August 1791, when Volume I of Transactions of the Linnean Society of London was produced. Over the following centuries the society published a number of different journals, some of which specialised in more specific subject areas, whilst earlier publications were discontinued.

Those still in publication include: the Biological Journal of the Linnean Society, which covers the evolutionary biology of all organisms, Botanical Journal of the Linnean Society, which focuses on plant sciences, and Zoological Journal of the Linnean Society focusing on animal systematics and evolution. In 2022, the society launched the Evolutionary Journal of the Linnean Society, its first fully open access scholarly publication.

The Linnean is a biannual newsletter. It contains commentary on recent activities and events, articles on history and science, and occasional biographies/obituaries of people connected to the Linnean Society; it also includes book reviews, reference material and correspondence. The society also publishes books and Synopses of the British Fauna, a series of field-guides.

Previously, an electronic magazine for Fellows, Pulse, was produced quarterly. This ceased publication in 2021.

== Presidents ==
- 1788–1828: Sir James Edward Smith
- 1828–1833: Edward Smith-Stanley, 13th Earl of Derby
- 1833–1836: Edward St Maur, 11th Duke of Somerset
- 1837–1849: Edward Stanley
- 1849–1853: Robert Brown
- 1853–1861: Thomas Bell
- 1861–1874: George Bentham
- 1874–1881: George James Allman
- 1881–1886: Sir John Lubbock, 4th Baronet (later 1st Baron Avebury)
- 1886–1890: William Carruthers
- 1890–1894: Charles Stewart
- 1894–1896: Charles Baron Clarke
- 1896–1900: Albert Charles Lewis Gotthilf Günther
- 1900–1904: Sydney Howard Vines
- 1904–1908: William Abbott Herdman
- 1908–1912: Dukinfield Henry Scott
- 1912–1916: Sir Edward Poulton
- 1916–1919: Sir David Prain
- 1919–1923: Arthur Smith Woodward
- 1923–1927: Alfred Barton Rendle
- 1927–1931: Sidney Frederic Harmer
- 1931–1934: Frederick Ernest Weiss
- 1934–1937: William Thomas Calman
- 1937–1940: John Ramsbottom
- 1940–1943: Edward Stuart Russell
- 1943–1946: Arthur Disbrowe Cotton
- 1946–1949: Sir Gavin de Beer
- 1949–1952: Felix Eugen Fritsch
- 1952–1955: Robert Beresford Seymour Sewell
- 1955–1958: Hugh Hamshaw Thomas
- 1958–1961: Carl Pantin
- 1961–1964: Thomas Maxwell Harris
- 1964–1967: Errol White
- 1967–1970: Arthur Roy Clapham
- 1970–1973: Alexander James Edward Cave
- 1973–1976: Irene Manton
- 1976–1979: Humphry Greenwood
- 1979–1982: William T. Stearn
- 1982–1985: Robert James "Sam" Berry
- 1985–1988: William Gilbert Chaloner
- 1988–1991: Michael Frederick Claridge
- 1991–1994: John G. Hawkes
- 1994–1997: Brian G. Gardiner
- 1997–2000: Sir Ghillean Prance
- 2000–2003: Sir David Smith
- 2003–2006: Gordon McGregor Reid
- 2006–2009: David F. Cutler
- 2009–2012: Vaughan R. Southgate
- 2012–2015: Dianne Edwards
- 2015–2018: Paul Brakefield
- 2018–2022: Sandra Knapp
- 2022–2025: Anjali Goswami
- 2025-: Mark Watson

== Arms ==
The College of Arms has granted the following coat of arms to the Linnean Society of London:

Coat of arms of Linnean Society of London
| Granted 1 March 1960 Adopted 1802 Crest On a wreath of the colours behind a mount in which vegetates the linnaea-borealis the sun rising in splendour all Proper. Escutcheon Per fesse the chief per pale Gules and Vert the base Sable on a fesse Argent a hurt charged with an egg erect Proper. Supporters On the dexter side a lion Or gorged with a linnaea-borealis Proper therefrom a shield pendent per pale wavy Argent and Ermine charged with a rose slipped Gules and a thistle fesseways Proper and on the sinister side an eagle rising Proper gorged as the dexter therefrom a shield pendent Argent charged with a trefoil slipped Vert. |

== Fellows ==
For the fellows of the Linnean Society of London, see: Fellows of the Linnean Society of London

== See also ==
- Dorothea Pertz, one of the first women awarded full membership
- Linnaeus Link Project
