= Henry Tanworth Wells =

English painter

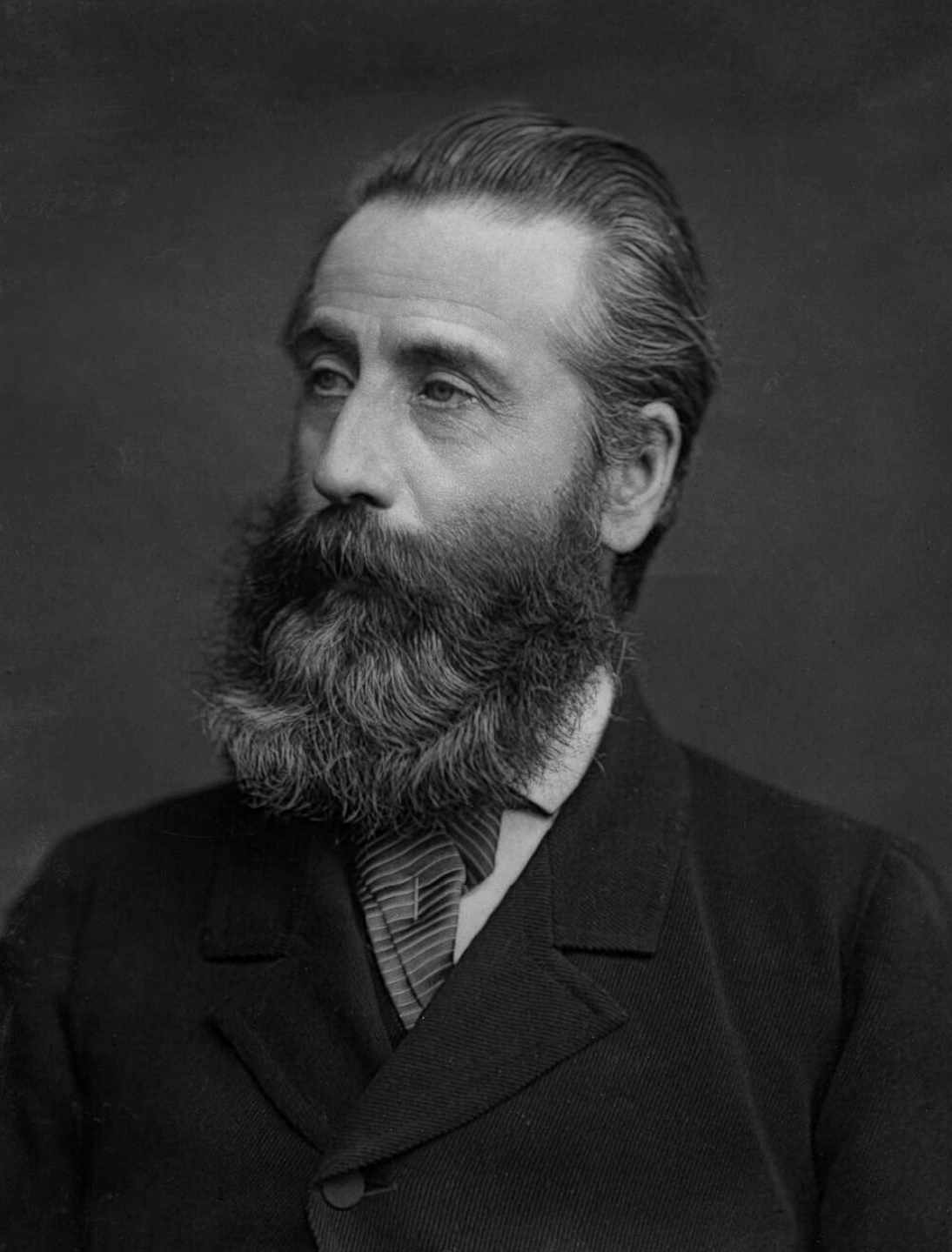
- Wells c. 1878
- Born: 14 December 1828; Marylebone, London, England
- Died: 16 January 1903 (aged 74); Kensington, London, England
- Education: Lancing College
- Known for: Portraits, miniatures
- Notable work: Victoria Regina
- Movement: Academic
- Elected: Royal Academy

Henry Tanworth Wells RA (14 December 1828 – 16 January 1903) was an English portrait painter. He was a member of the Pre-Raphaelite circle, though he painted in the academic style.

His most popular painting was Victoria Regina, of which he made two versions: 1877 Tate, and 1887, Royal Collection, showing the young Queen Victoria receiving the news of her accession to the throne.

== Biography ==
Wells was born in London on 14 December 1828, the only son of Henry Tanworth Wells (senior), a merchant, and his wife Charlotte Henman. He was baptised in St Pancras Old Church. They lived in Percy Street, St Pancras from 1838 to 1854. He was educated at Lancing College, Sussex.

Wells first met the artist Joanna Mary Boyce in Betws-y-Coed in north Wales in 1849, where she was studying under painter David Cox. He arranged to be introduced to Boyce in 1851, and asked her to marry him in 1855. She refused, saying she wanted to be free to "carry on her life's work". He pursued her, and they were engaged, but after her father's death, her mother persuaded her to change her mind, and Joanna gave the engagement ring back. Wells still did not give up, and despite social disapproval they continued to write to each other. They married on 9 December 1857. They had two daughters, Alice Joanna Street and Joanna Margaret Hadley. His wife Joanna died in childbirth after four years of marriage in 1861. Her brother was the Pre-Raphaelite painter George Price Boyce, so the marriage brought Wells into the group of friends that included Dante Gabriel Rossetti, Ford Madox Brown and John Ruskin.

Wells was trained as an artist in his teens, first being apprenticed to Messrs Dickinson as a draughtsman for lithographs in 1843 (aged 15), changing to miniature painting for the same firm. While working, he studied at J.M. Leigh's school during the evenings. He began to exhibit his work at the Royal Academy when he was only 18. In 1850 he went to Paris for six months to learn from the portrait painter Thomas Couture. When photography took over most of the market for miniature images, in 1861 Wells switched to painting portraits in oils, becoming known as the painter to choose for military groups. He also executed crayon portraits of individuals in society and politics.

His popular painting Victoria Regina, which depicts Victoria hearing that she had become Queen, was widely reproduced in prints and postcards during her reign. It exists in two versions: one exhibited at the Royal Academy in 1880 (now in the Tate Gallery) and a smaller one, with a different background, painted in 1887 and later presented to Edward VII (Royal Collection).

Wells was elected as a member of the Royal Academy on 30 June 1870.

He died at his home, Thorpe Lodge, on Campden Hill in Kensington on 16 January 1903 and was buried in Kensal Green cemetery.

Wells's works can be found in the major art collections of England, including the British Museum, National Portrait Gallery, Tate Gallery, Royal Academy, Royal Collection, Government Art Collection, National Trust Collections, and Royal Albert Memorial Museum.

== Gallery ==
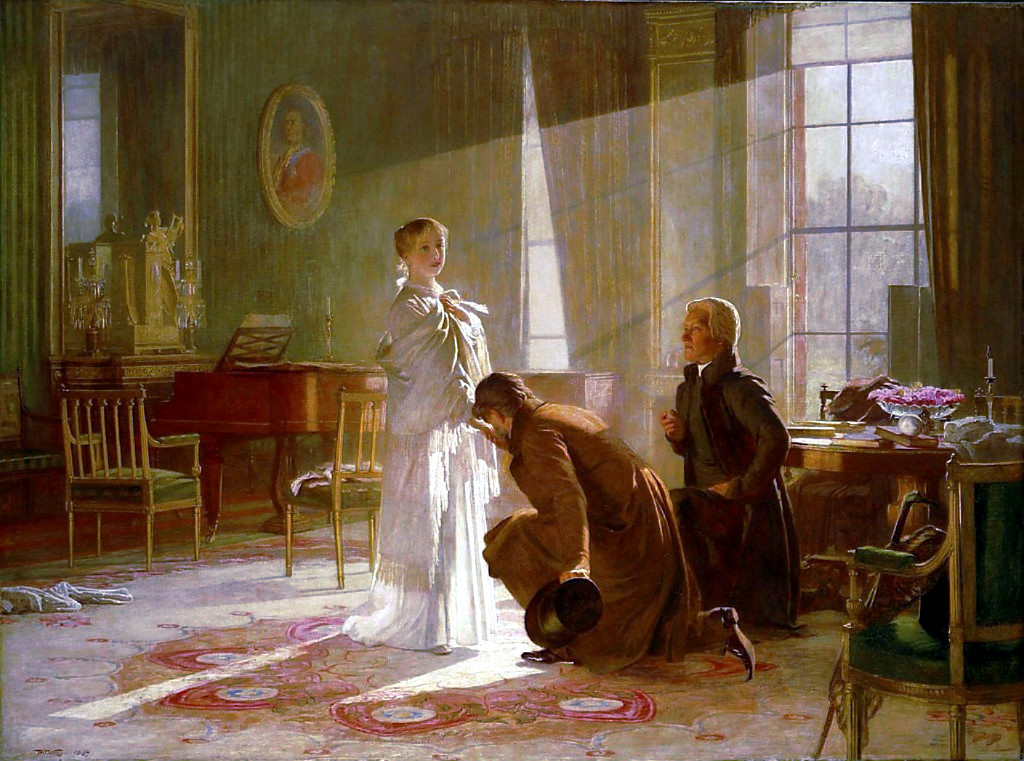
Victoria Regina (1887, Royal Collection)

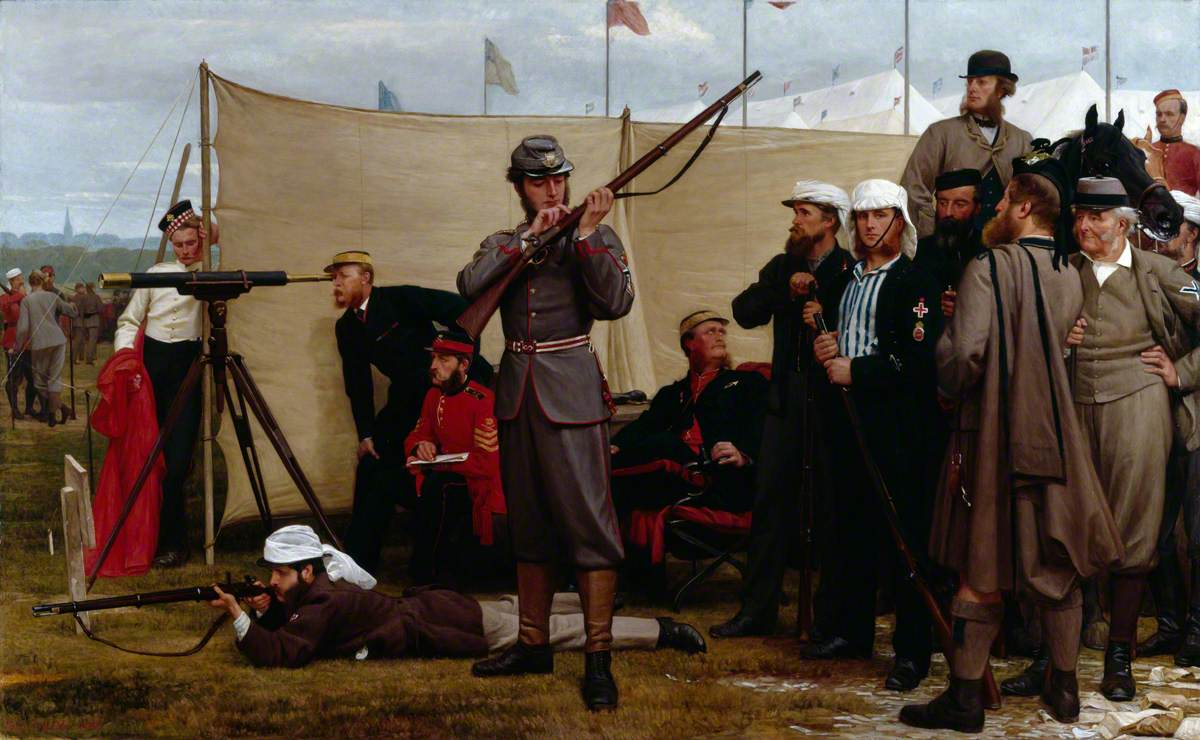
Volunteers at a Firing Point (1866)

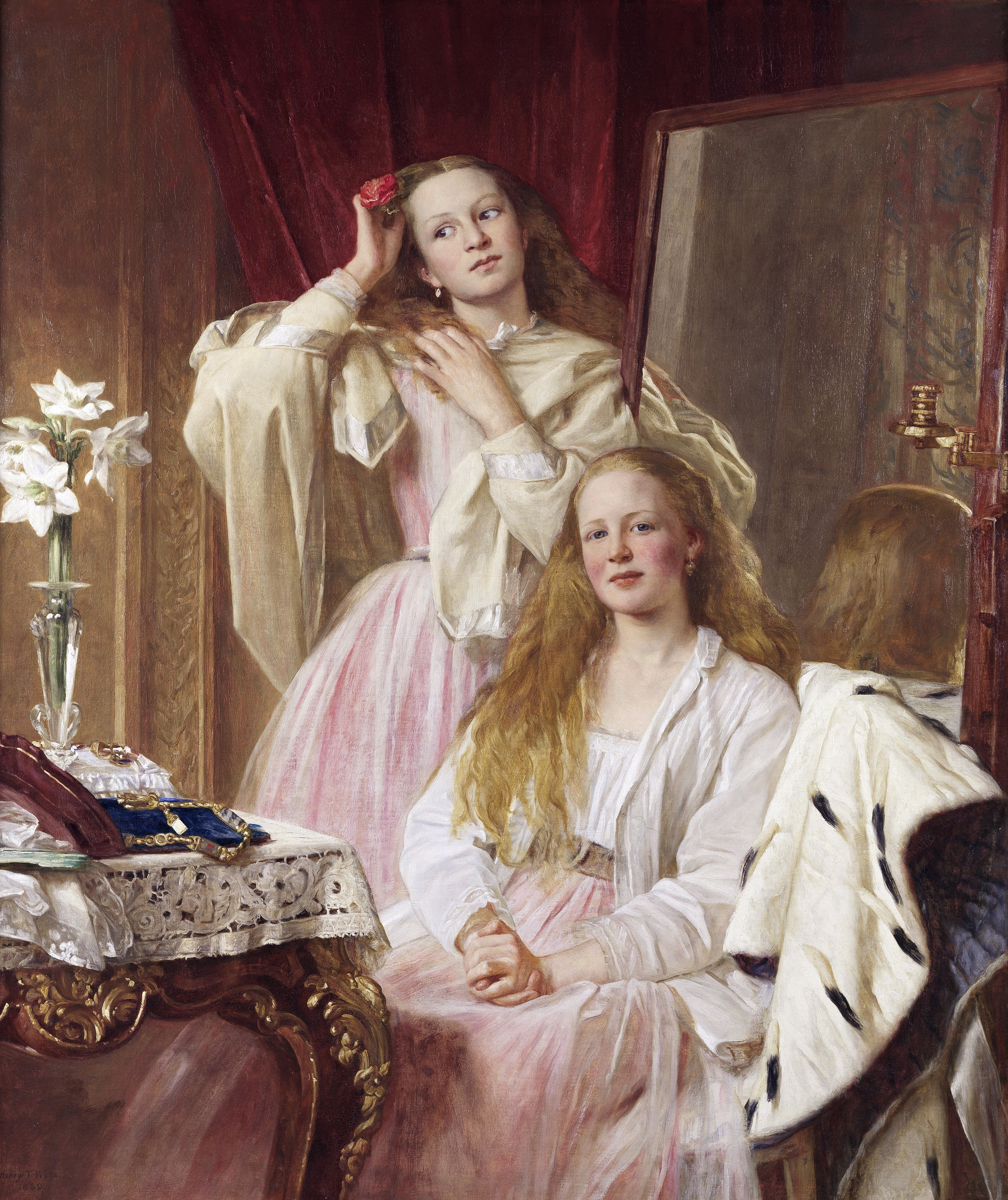
Emma and Federica Bankes of Soughton Hall (1869)

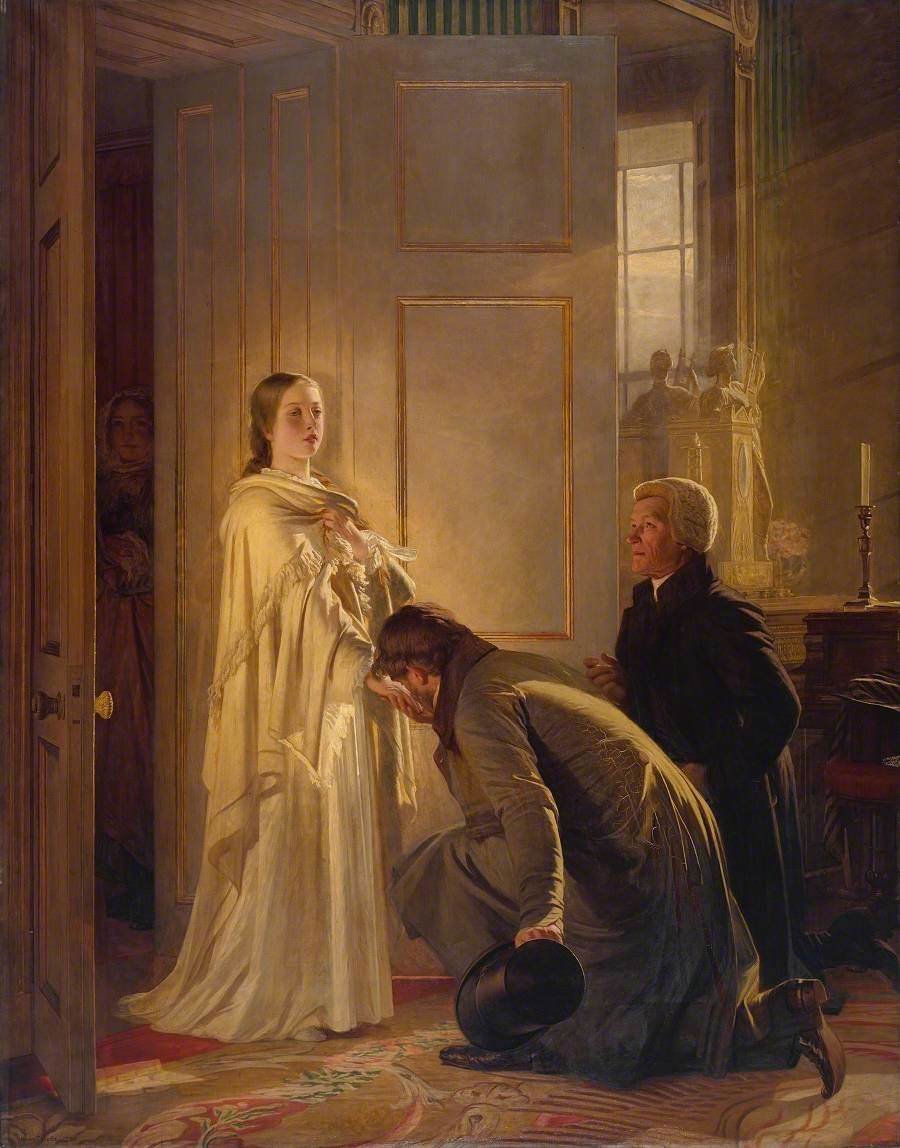
Victoria Regina (1877, Tate Britain)

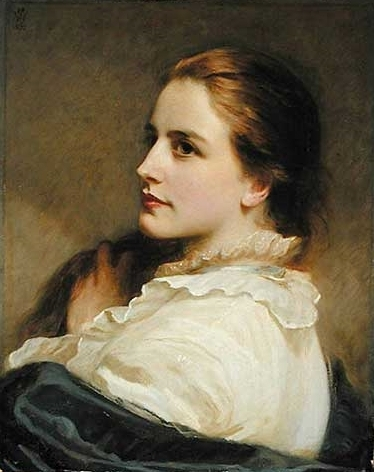
Alice (1877)

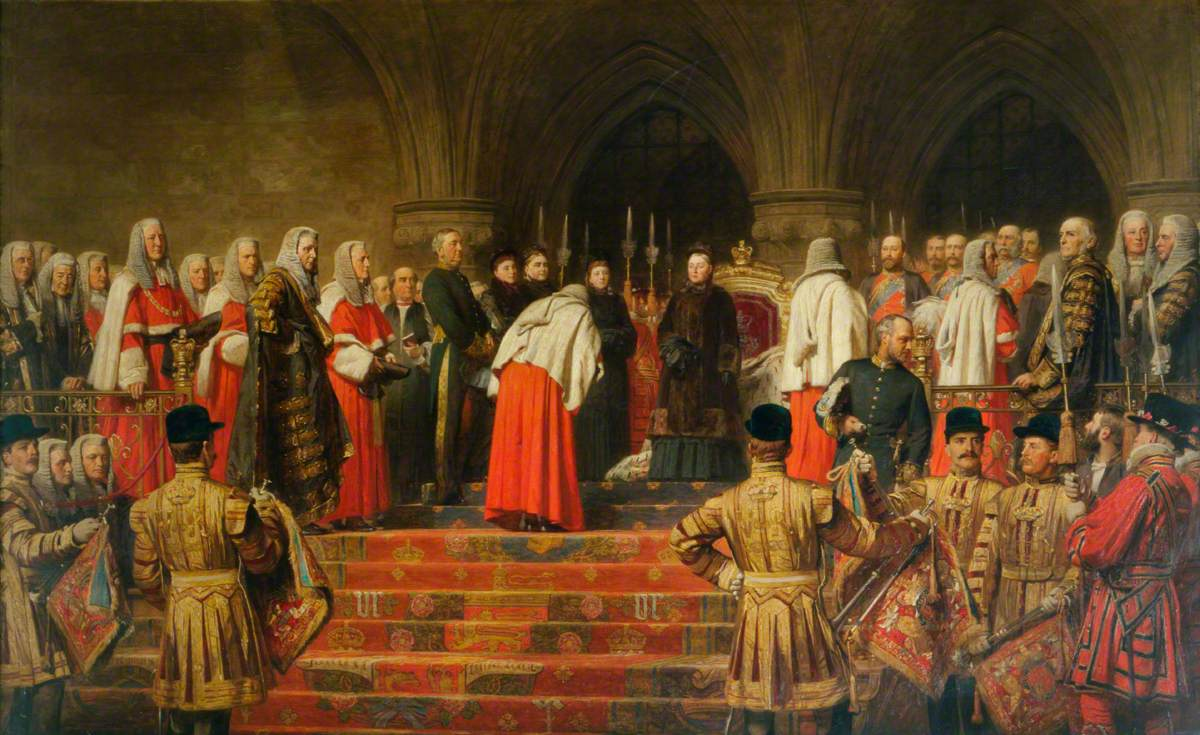
Opening of the Royal Courts of Justice by Queen Victoria (1887)

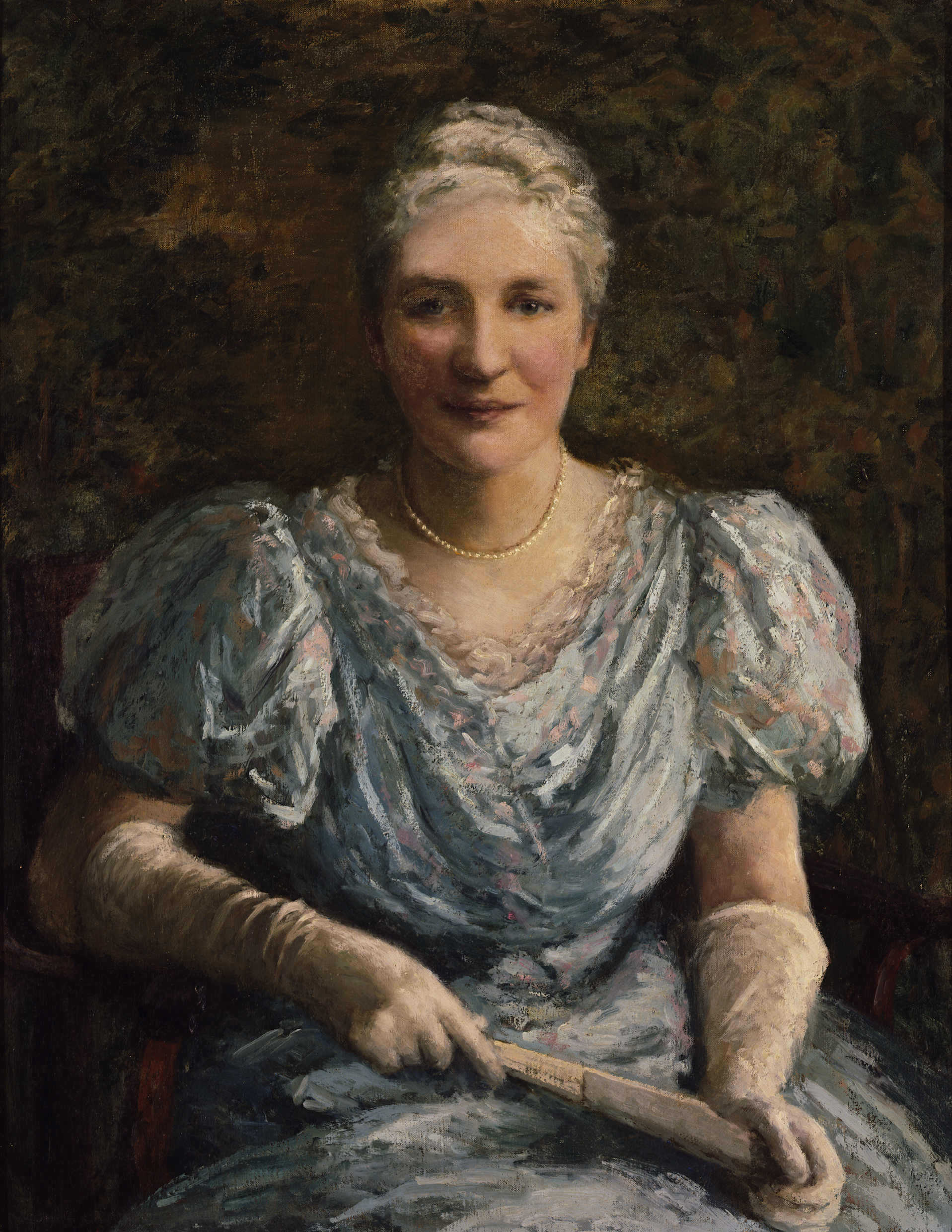
Portrait of Mrs. Constance Sladen (c. 1900)

== Bibliography ==
- Bradbury, Sue (2012). Joanna, George and Henry: A Pre-Raphaelite Tale of Art, Love and Friendship. Boydell Press. ISBN 9781843836179.
- "Wells, Henry Tanworth". Oxford Dictionary of National Biography (online ed.). Oxford University Press. doi:10.1093/ref:odnb/36830. (Subscription, Wikipedia Library access or UK public library membership required.)
- Oxford DNB: Wells, Henry Tanworth
