= Percy Sladen Memorial Trust =

Trust fund administered by the Linnean Society in memory of Percy Sladen

The Percy Sladen Memorial Trust is a trust fund administered by the Linnean Society of London for the support of scientific research. It was endowed by Constance Sladen, who was married to the marine biologist Percy Sladen (1849–1900), in his memory.

The Trust has in general been devoted to the support of field work. Major scientific expeditions that have been funded under the Trust include:

- the Percy Sladen Trust Expedition to the Indian Ocean (1905)

- the Percy Sladen Trust Expedition to Melanesia;
- the Percy Sladen Trust Expedition to West Africa;
- the Percy Sladen Trust Expeditions to the Abrolhos Islands (1913, 1915);
- the Percy Sladen and Godman Trusts expedition to the islands in the Gulf of Guinea (1932–1933);
- the Percy Sladen Trust Expedition to Lake Titicaca (1937)

Other uses of the fund include a grant to the Royal Albert Memorial Museum in Exeter, towards curation of the Sladen Collection of echinoderms.
