= Winslow Homer =

American landscape painter (1836–1910)

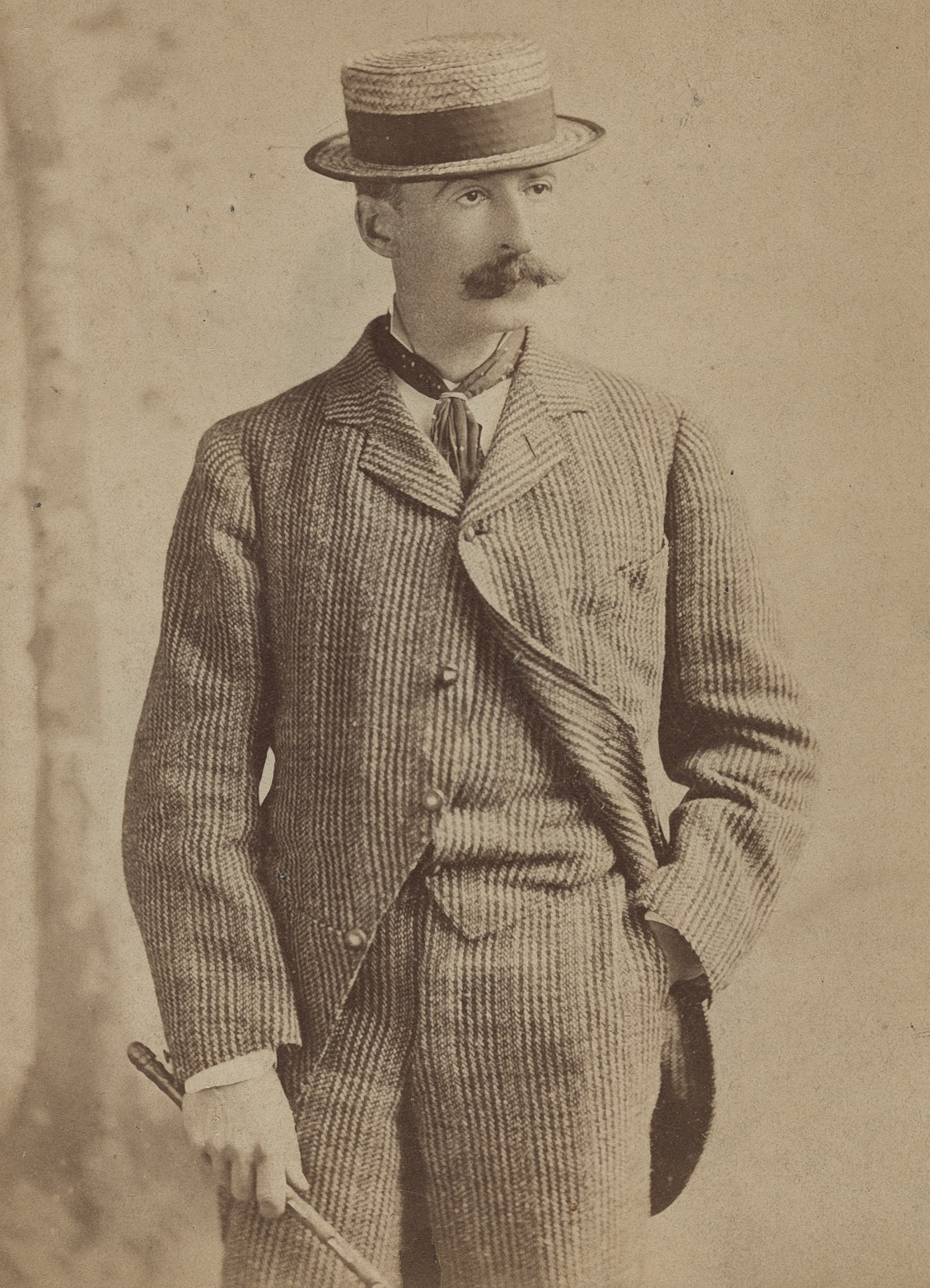
- Homer in 1880
- Born: February 24, 1836; Boston, Massachusetts, U.S.
- Died: September 29, 1910 (aged 74); Scarborough, Maine, U.S.
- Education: Lithography apprenticeship, 1855–56; National Academy of Design (painting), 1863; Paris (informal), 1867
- Known for: Drawing; Wood engraving Oil painting Watercolor painting
- Notable work: Harper's Weekly Magazine; Ballou's Pictorial Magazine; Snap the Whip; The Veteran in a New Field; Breezing Up (A Fair Wind)
- Movement: Realism, American Realism

Winslow Homer (February 24, 1836 – September 29, 1910) was an American landscape painter and illustrator, best known for his marine subjects. He is considered one of the foremost painters of 19th-century America and a preeminent figure in American art.

Largely self-taught, Homer began his career working as a commercial illustrator. He subsequently took up oil painting and produced major studio works characterized by the weight and density he exploited from the medium. He also worked extensively in watercolor, creating a fluid and prolific œuvre, primarily chronicling his working vacations.

== Early life ==
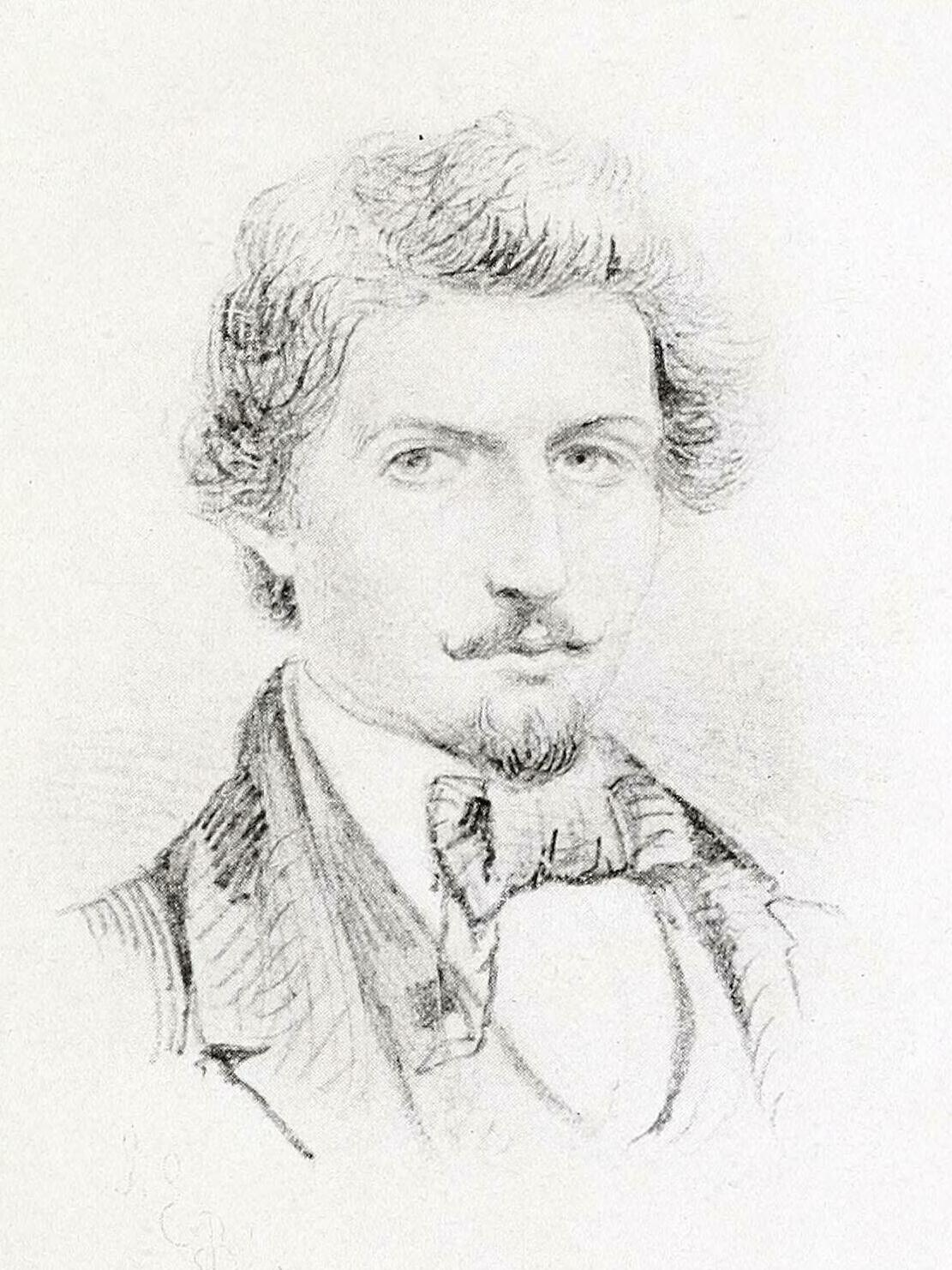
A portrait illustration of Homer at the age of 21

Homer was born in Boston, Massachusetts, on February 24, 1836, the second of three sons of Charles Savage Homer and Henrietta Maria Benson Homer, both from long lines of New Englanders. His mother was a gifted amateur watercolorist and Homer's first teacher. She and her son had a close relationship throughout their lives. Homer took on many of her traits, including her quiet, strong-willed, terse, sociable nature, her dry sense of humor, and her artistic talent. Homer had a happy childhood, growing up mostly in then-rural Cambridge, Massachusetts. He was an average student, but his art talent was evident in his early years.

Homer's father was a volatile, restless businessman who was always looking to "make a killing". When Homer was 13 years old, Charles gave up the hardware store business to seek a fortune in the California gold rush. When that failed, Charles left his family and went to Europe to raise capital for other get-rich-quick schemes that did not pay off.

After Homer's high school graduation, his father saw a newspaper advertisement and arranged for an apprenticeship. Homer's apprenticeship at the age of 19 to J. H. Bufford, a Boston commercial lithographer, was a formative but "treadmill experience". He worked repetitively on sheet music covers and other commercial work for two years. By 1857, his freelance career was underway after he turned down an offer to join the staff of Harper's Weekly. "From the time I took my nose off that lithographic stone," Homer later stated, "I have had no master, and never shall have any." Homer opened his own studio in Boston.

Homer's career as an illustrator lasted nearly twenty years. He contributed illustrations of Boston life and rural New England life to magazines such as Ballou's Pictorial and Harper's Weekly at a time when the market for illustrations was growing rapidly and fads and fashions were changing quickly. His early works, mostly commercial wood engravings of urban and country social scenes, are characterized by clean outlines, simplified forms, dramatic contrast of light and dark, and lively figure groupings—qualities that remained important throughout his career. His quick success was mostly due to this strong understanding of graphic design and also to the adaptability of his designs to wood engraving.

Before moving to New York City in 1859, Homer lived in Belmont, Massachusetts, with his family. His uncle's Belmont mansion, the 1853 Homer House, was the inspiration for a number of his early illustrations and paintings, including several of his 1860s croquet pictures. The Homer House, owned by the Belmont Woman's Club, is open for public tours.

Winslow's brother Charles S. Homer Jr., a Harvard-educated chemist, was hired by Lawson Valentine to work for the paint company Valentine & Co, later known as Valspar. Lawson Valentine became important to Winslow Homer as an early and significant collector of his work, later providing him with a studio at their farm in New York.

== Homer's studio ==
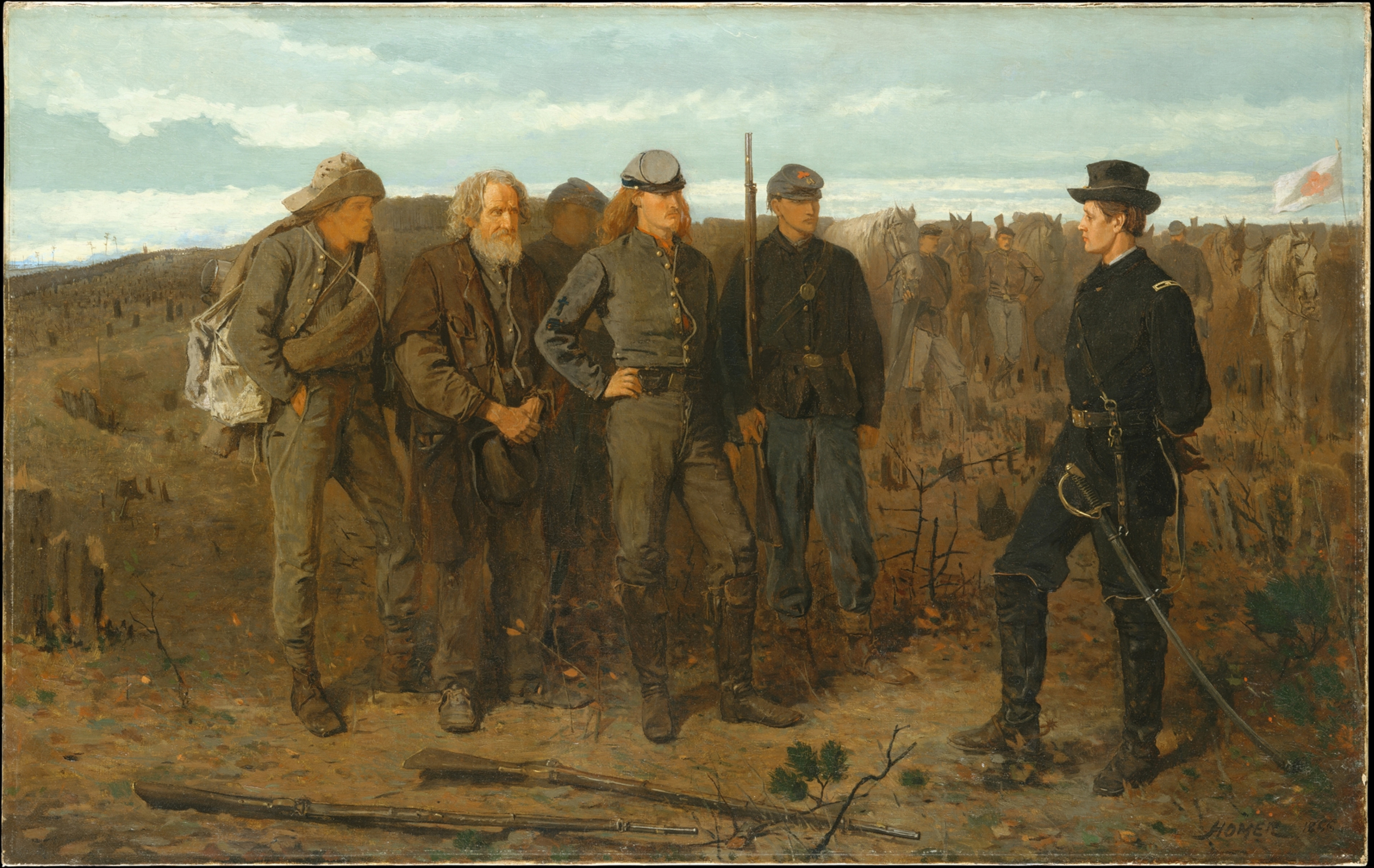
Prisoners from the Front (1866), housed in the Metropolitan Museum of Art in New York City

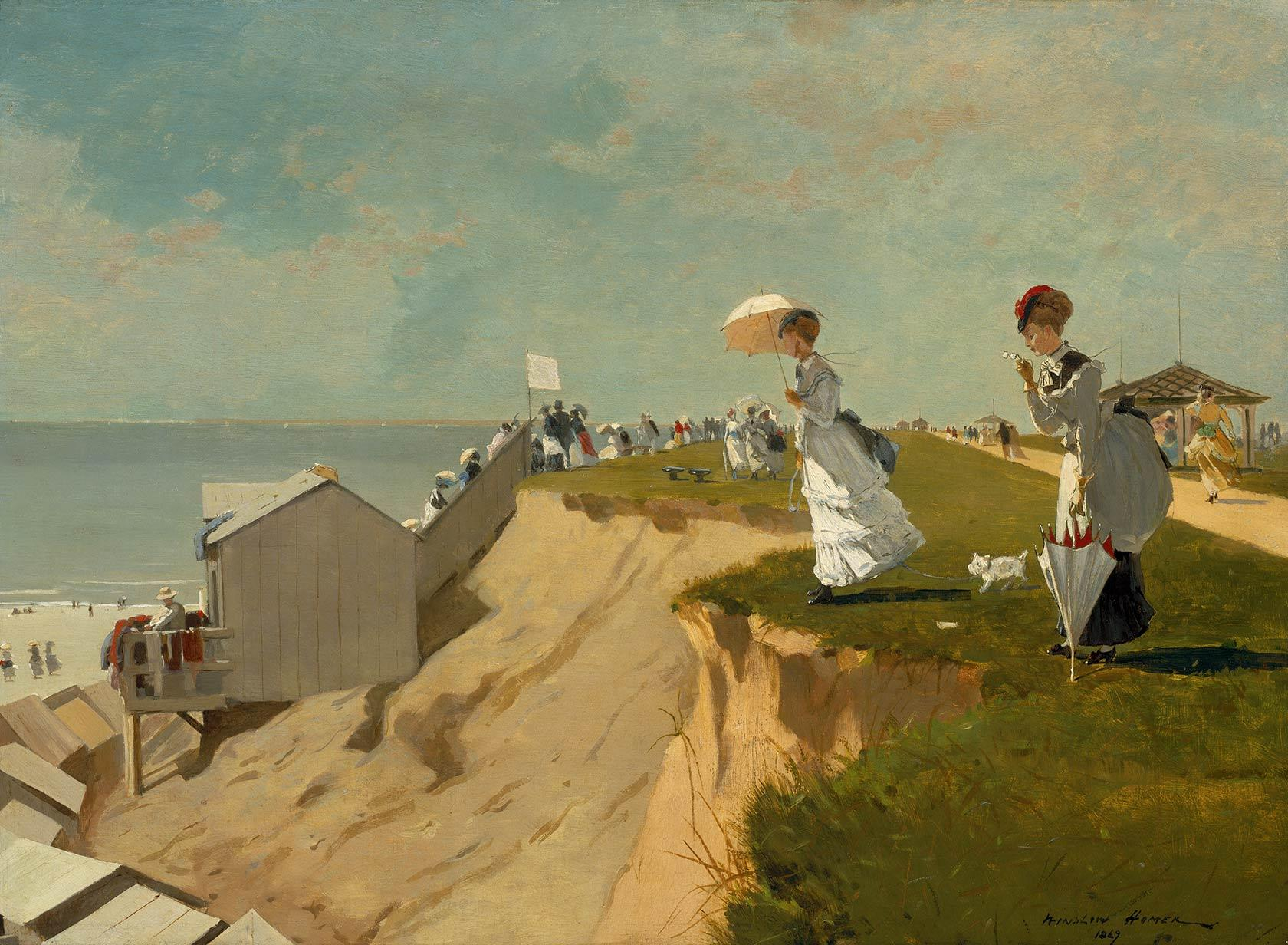
Long Branch, New Jersey (1869), housed in the Museum of Fine Arts in Boston

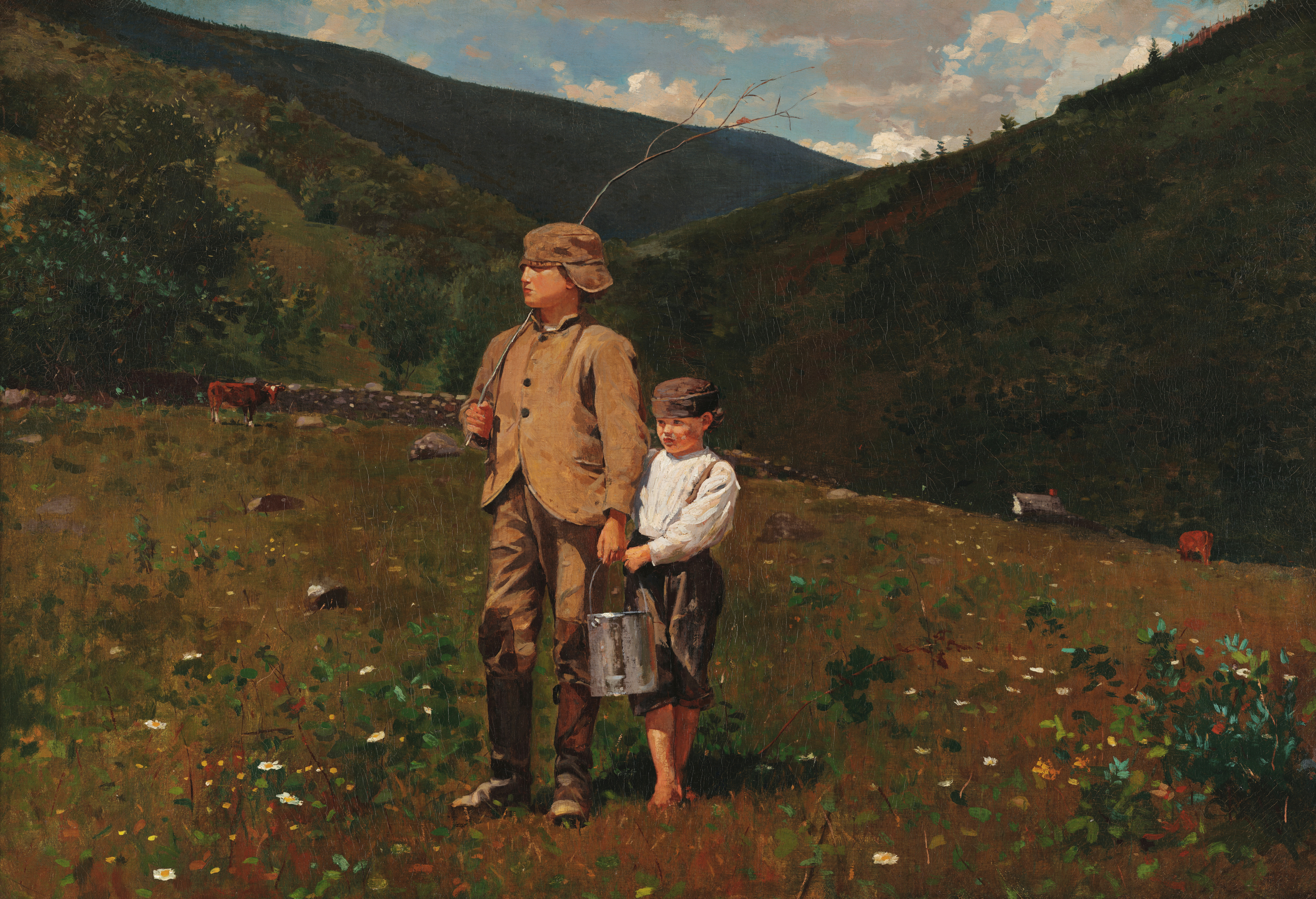
Crossing the Pasture (1871–72), housed in the Amon Carter Museum of American Art

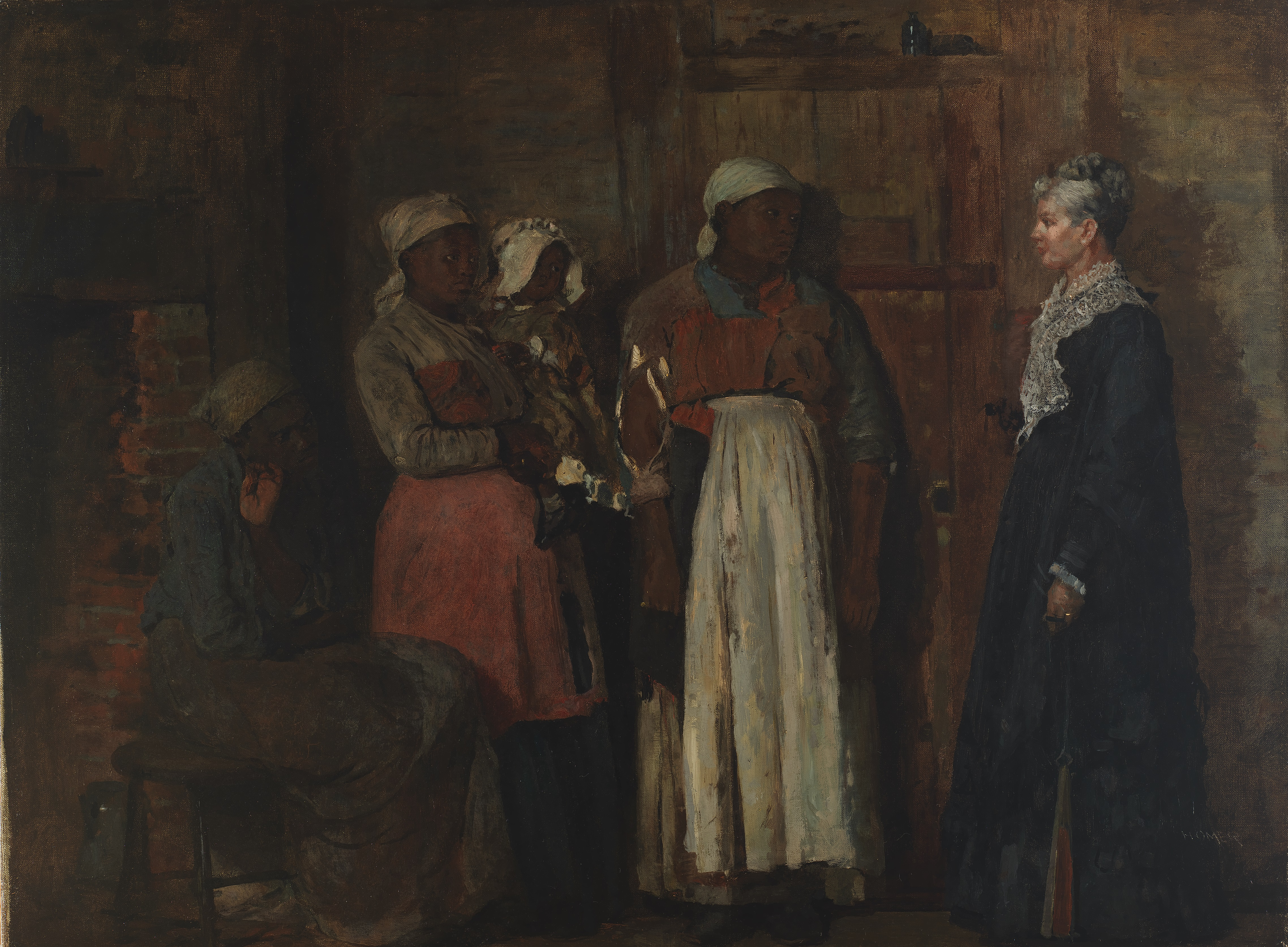
A Visit from the Old Mistress (1876), housed in the Smithsonian American Art Museum

In 1859, he opened a studio in the Tenth Street Studio Building in New York City, the artistic and publishing capital of the United States. Until 1863, he attended classes at the National Academy of Design, and studied briefly with Frederick Rondel, who taught him the basics of painting. In only about a year of self-training, Homer was producing excellent oil work. His mother tried to raise family funds to send him to Europe for further study but instead Harper's sent Homer to the front lines of the American Civil War (1861–1865), where he sketched battle scenes and camp life, the quiet moments as well as the chaotic ones. His initial sketches were of the camp, commanders, and army of the famous Union officer, Major General George B. McClellan, at the banks of the Potomac River in October 1861.

Although the drawings did not get much attention at the time, they mark Homer's expanding skills from illustrator to painter. As with his urban scenes, Homer illustrated women during wartime, and showed the effects of the war on the home front. The war work was dangerous and exhausting. Back at his studio, Homer would regain his strength and re-focus his artistic vision. He set to work on a series of war-related paintings based on his sketches, among them Sharpshooter on Picket Duty (1862), Home, Sweet Home (1863), and Prisoners from the Front (1866). He exhibited paintings of these subjects every year at the National Academy of Design from 1863 to 1866. Home, Sweet Home was shown at the National Academy to particular critical acclaim; it was quickly sold and the artist was consequently elected an Associate Academician, then a full Academician in 1865. During this time, he also continued to sell his illustrations to periodicals such as Our Young Folks and Frank Leslie's Chimney Corner.

After the American Civil War, Homer turned his attention primarily to scenes of childhood and young women, reflecting nostalgia for simpler times, both his own and the nation's as a whole.

Homer was also interested in postwar subject matter that conveyed the silent tension between two communities seeking to understand their future. His oil painting A Visit from the Old Mistress (1876) shows an encounter between a group of four freed slaves and their former mistress. The formal equivalence between the standing figures suggests the balance that the nation hoped to find in the difficult years of Reconstruction. Homer composed this painting from sketches he had made while traveling through Virginia.

Near the beginning of his painting career, the 27-year-old Homer demonstrated a maturity of feeling, depth of perception, and mastery of technique which was immediately recognized. His realism was objective, true to nature, and emotionally controlled. One critic wrote, "Winslow Homer is one of those few young artists who make a decided impression of their power with their very first contributions to the Academy ... He at this moment wields a better pencil, models better, colors better, than many whom, were it not improper, we could mention as regular contributors to the Academy." And of Home, Sweet Home specifically, "There is no clap-trap about it. The delicacy and strength of emotion which reign throughout this little picture are not surpassed in the whole exhibition." "It is a work of real feeling, soldiers in camp listening to the evening band, and thinking of the wives and darlings far away. There is no strained effect in it, no sentimentality, but a hearty, homely actuality, broadly, freely, and simply worked out."

== Early landscapes and watercolors ==
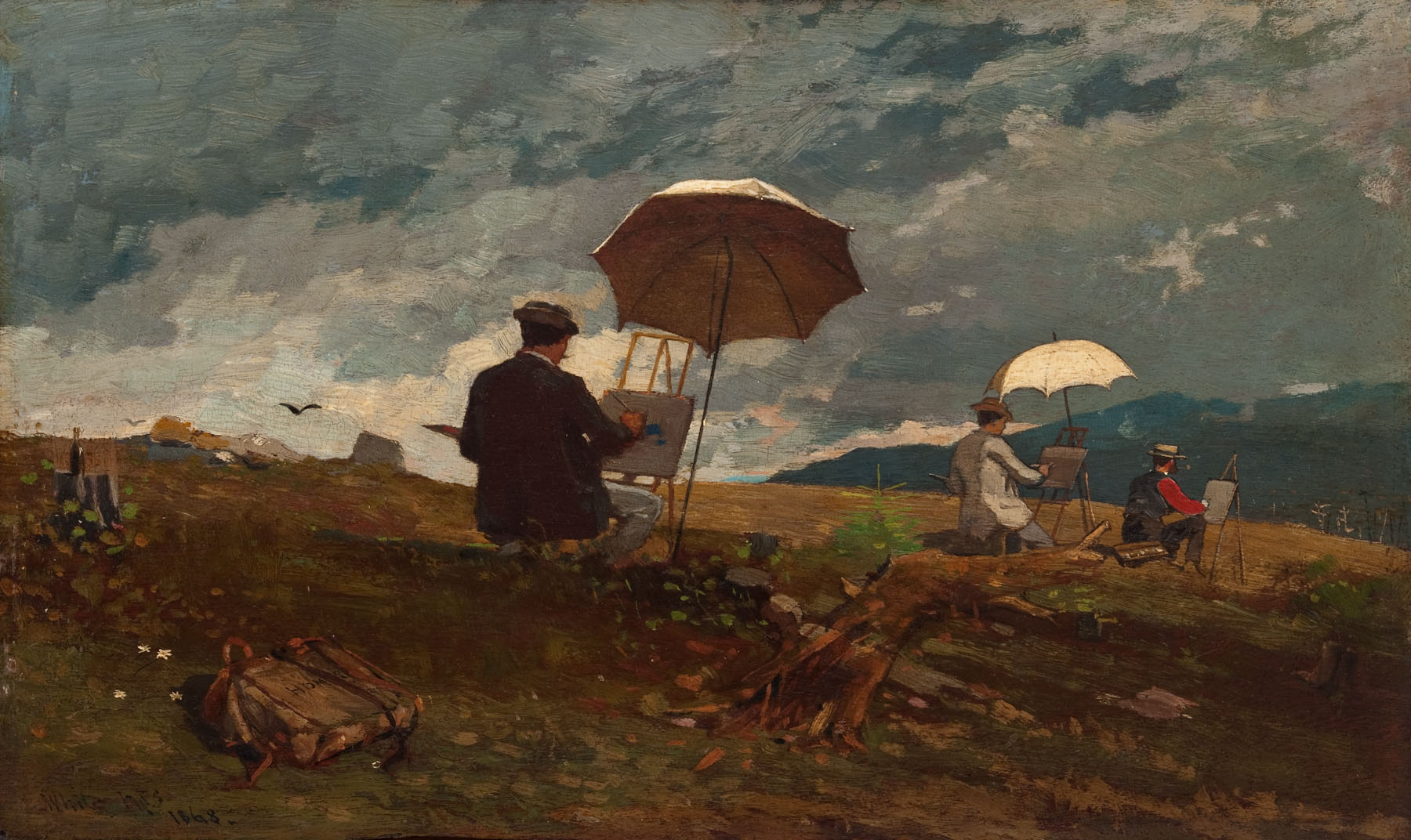
Artists Sketching in the White Mountains, 1868, housed in the Portland Museum of Art in Portland, Maine

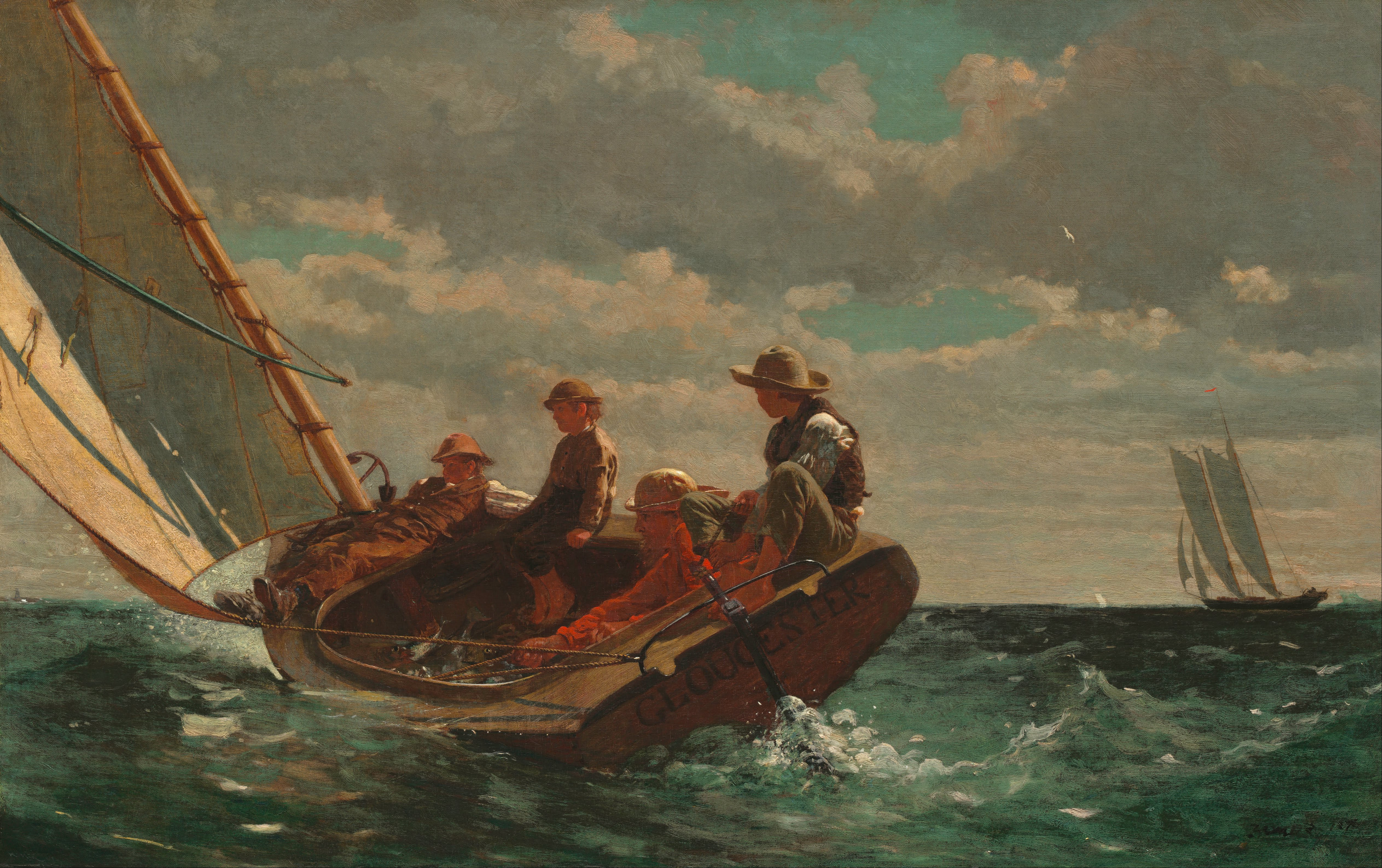
Breezing Up (A Fair Wind) (1873–76), housed in the National Gallery of Art in Washington, D.C.

Before exhibiting at the National Academy of Design, Homer finally traveled to Paris, France, in 1867 where he remained for a year. His most praised early painting, Prisoners from the Front, was on exhibit at the Exposition Universelle in Paris at the same time. He did not study formally but he practiced landscape painting while continuing to work for Harper's, depicting scenes of Parisian life.

Homer painted approximately one dozen small paintings during the stay. Although he arrived in France at a time of new fashions in art, Homer's main subject for his paintings was peasant life, showing more of an alignment with the established French Barbizon school and the artist Millet than with newer artists Manet and Courbet. Though his interest in depicting natural light parallels that of the early impressionists, there is no evidence of direct influence as he was already a plein-air painter in America and had already evolved a personal style which was much closer to Manet than Monet. Homer was very private about his personal life and his methods (even denying his first biographer any personal information or commentary), but his stance was clearly one of independence of style and a devotion to American subjects. As his fellow artist Eugene Benson wrote, Homer believed that artists "should never look at pictures" but should "stutter in a language of their own."

Throughout the 1870s, Homer continued painting mostly rural or idyllic scenes of farm life, children playing, and young adults courting, including Country School (1871) and The Morning Bell (1872). In 1875, Homer quit working as a commercial illustrator and vowed to survive on his paintings and watercolors alone. Despite his excellent critical reputation, his finances continued to remain precarious. His popular 1872 painting Snap the Whip was exhibited at the 1876 Centennial Exposition in Philadelphia, Pennsylvania, as was one of his finest and most famous paintings, Breezing Up (1876). Of his work at this time, Henry James wrote:

We frankly confess that we detest his subjects ... he has chosen the least pictorial range of scenery and civilization; he has resolutely treated them as if they were pictorial ... and, to reward his audacity, he has incontestably succeeded.

Many disagreed with James. Breezing Up, Homer's iconic painting of a father and three boys out for a spirited sail, received wide praise. The New York Tribune wrote, "There is no picture in this exhibition, nor can we remember when there has been a picture in any exhibition, that can be named alongside this." Visits to Petersburg, Virginia, around 1876 resulted in paintings of rural African American life. The same straightforward sensibility which allowed Homer to distill art from these potentially sentimental subjects also yielded the most unaffected views of African American life at the time, as illustrated in Dressing for the Carnival (1877) and A Visit from the Old Mistress (1876).

In 1877, Homer exhibited for the first time at the Boston Art Club with the oil painting, An Afternoon Sun, (owned by the Artist). In 1878 Homer spent a particularly productive year as the guest of industrialist Lawson Valentine at his property in the Adirondack Mountains, Houghton Farm. From 1877 through 1909, Homer exhibited often at the Boston Art Club. Works on paper, both drawings and watercolors, were frequently exhibited by Homer beginning in 1882. A most unusual sculpture by the Artist, Hunter with Dog – Northwoods, was exhibited in 1902. By that year, Homer had switched his primary Gallery from the Boston-based Doll and Richards to the New York City based Knoedler & Co.

Homer became a member of The Tile Club, a group of artists and writers who met frequently to exchange ideas and organize outings for painting, as well as foster the creation of decorative tiles. For a short time, he designed tiles for fireplaces.

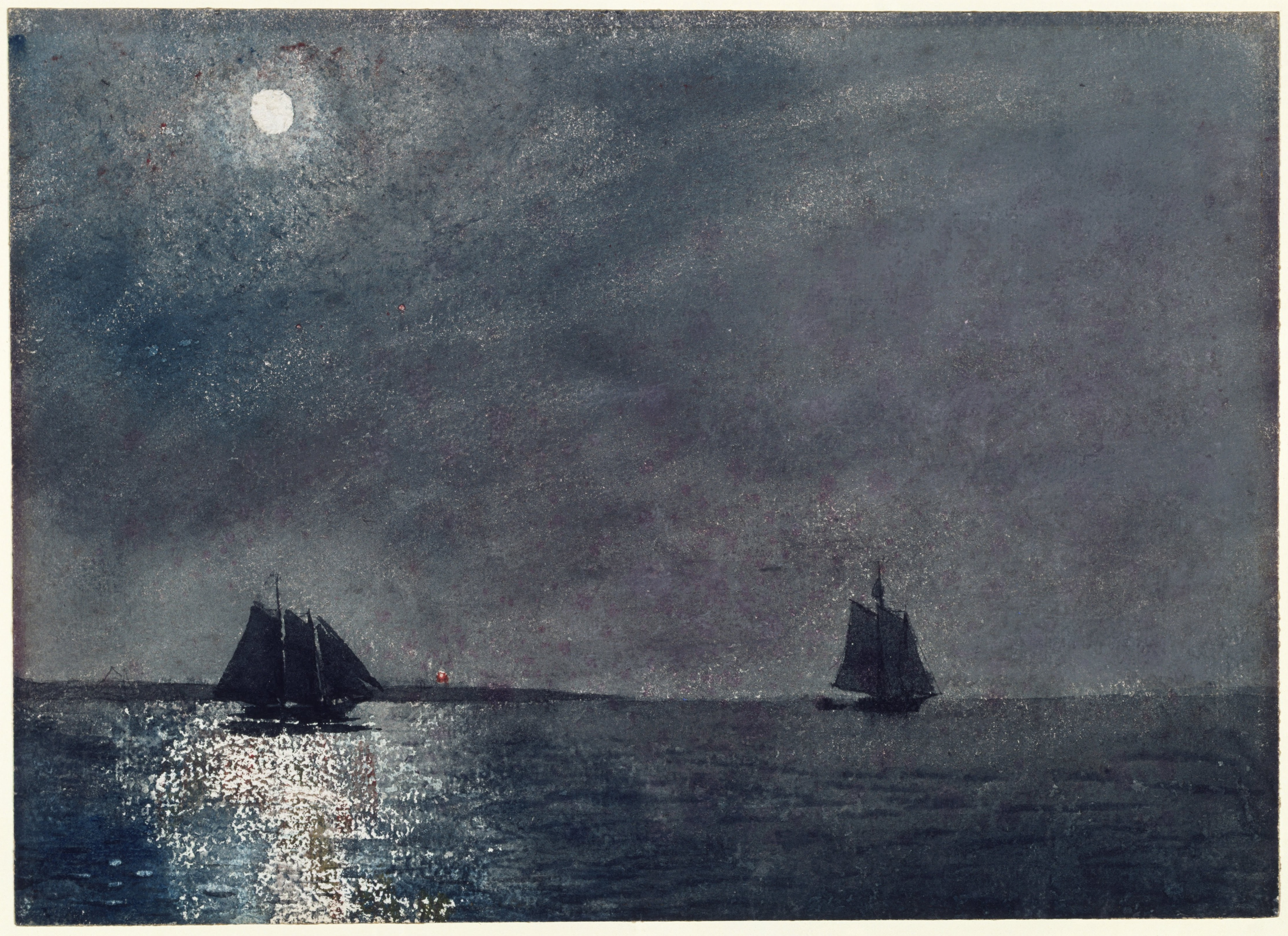
Eastern Point Light (1880; Princeton University Art Museum)

Homer's nickname in The Tile Club was "The Obtuse Bard". Other well known Tilers were painters William Merritt Chase, Arthur Quartley, and the sculptor Augustus Saint Gaudens.

Homer started painting with watercolors on a regular basis in 1873 during a summer stay in Gloucester, Massachusetts. From the beginning, his technique was natural, fluid and confident, demonstrating his innate talent for a difficult medium. His impact would be revolutionary. Here, again, the critics were puzzled at first, "A child with an ink bottle could not have done worse." Another critic said that Homer "made a sudden and desperate plunge into water color painting". But his watercolors proved popular and enduring, and sold more readily, improving his financial condition considerably. They varied from highly detailed (Blackboard – 1877) to broadly impressionistic (Schooner at Sunset – 1880). Some watercolors were made as preparatory sketches for oil paintings (as for "Breezing Up") and some as finished works in themselves. Thereafter, he seldom traveled without paper, brushes and water based paints.

As a result of disappointments with women or from some other emotional turmoil, Homer became reclusive in the late 1870s, no longer enjoying urban social life and living instead in Gloucester. For a while, he even lived in secluded Eastern Point Lighthouse (with the keeper's family). In re-establishing his love of the sea, Homer found a rich source of themes while closely observing the fishermen, the sea, and the marine weather. After 1880, he rarely featured genteel women at leisure, focusing instead on working women.

Early landscapes and watercolors

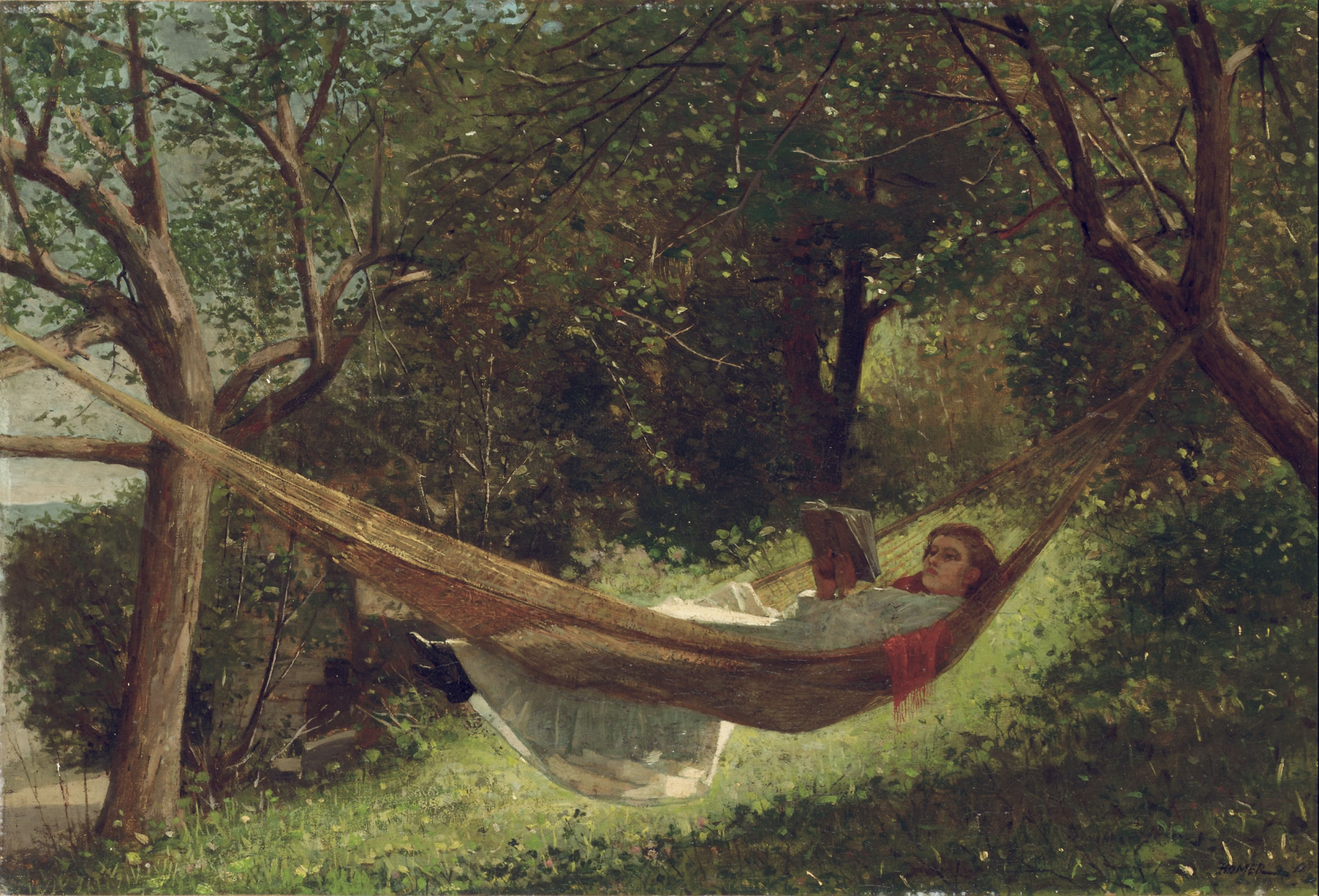
Girl in the Hammock, 1873

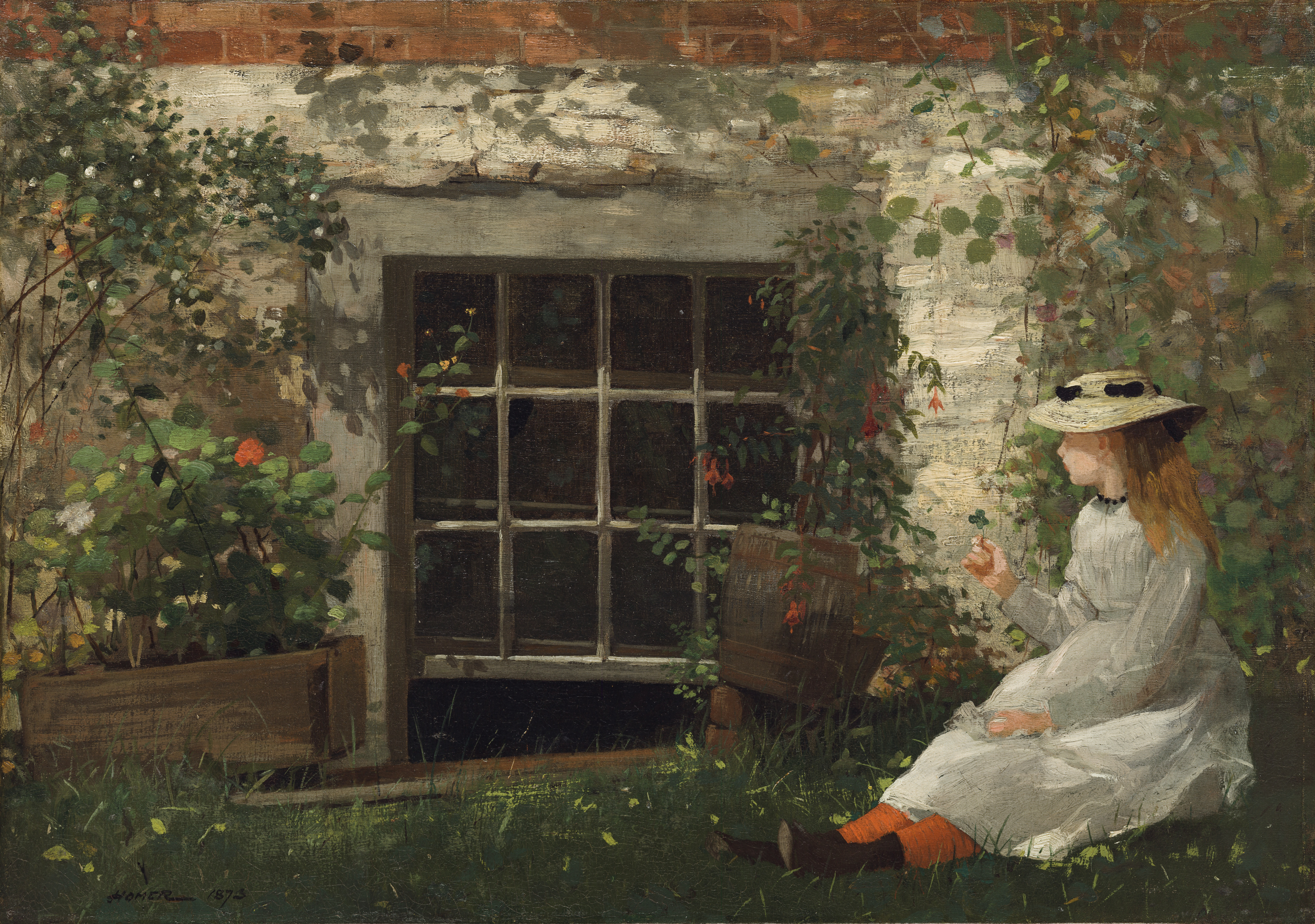
The Four Leaf Clover, 1873

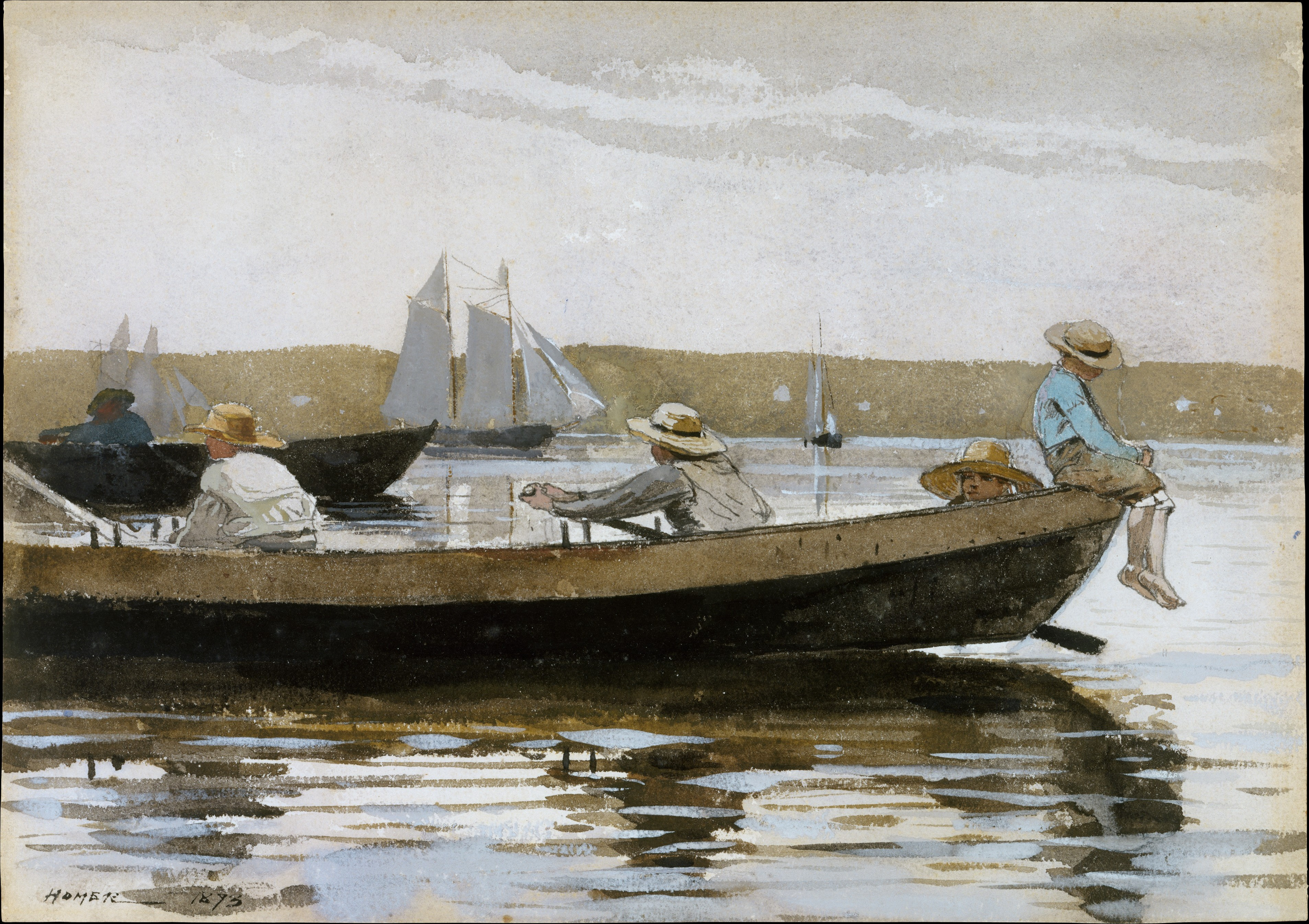
Boys in a Dory, 1873, Metropolitan Museum of Art

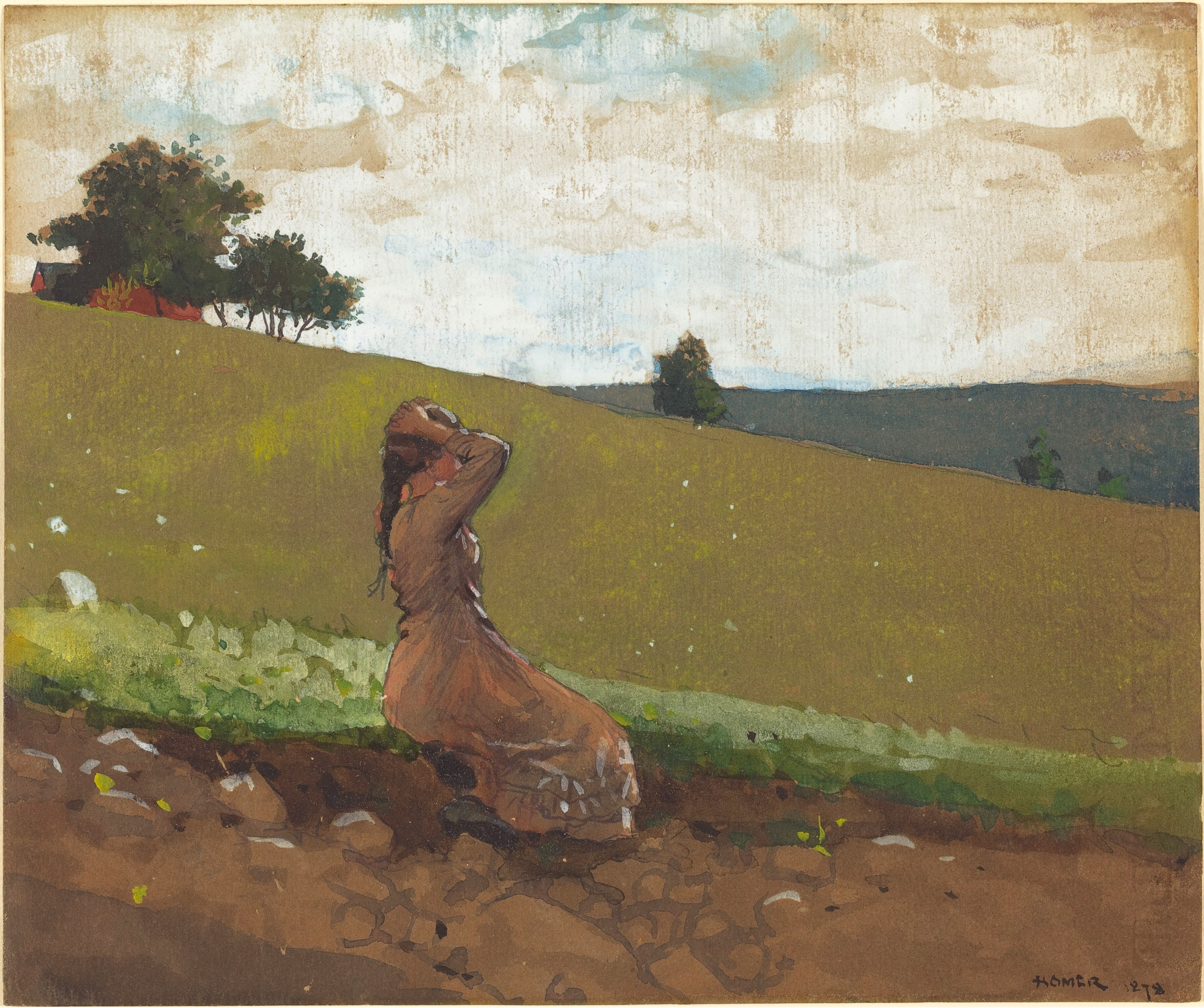
The Green Hill, 1878

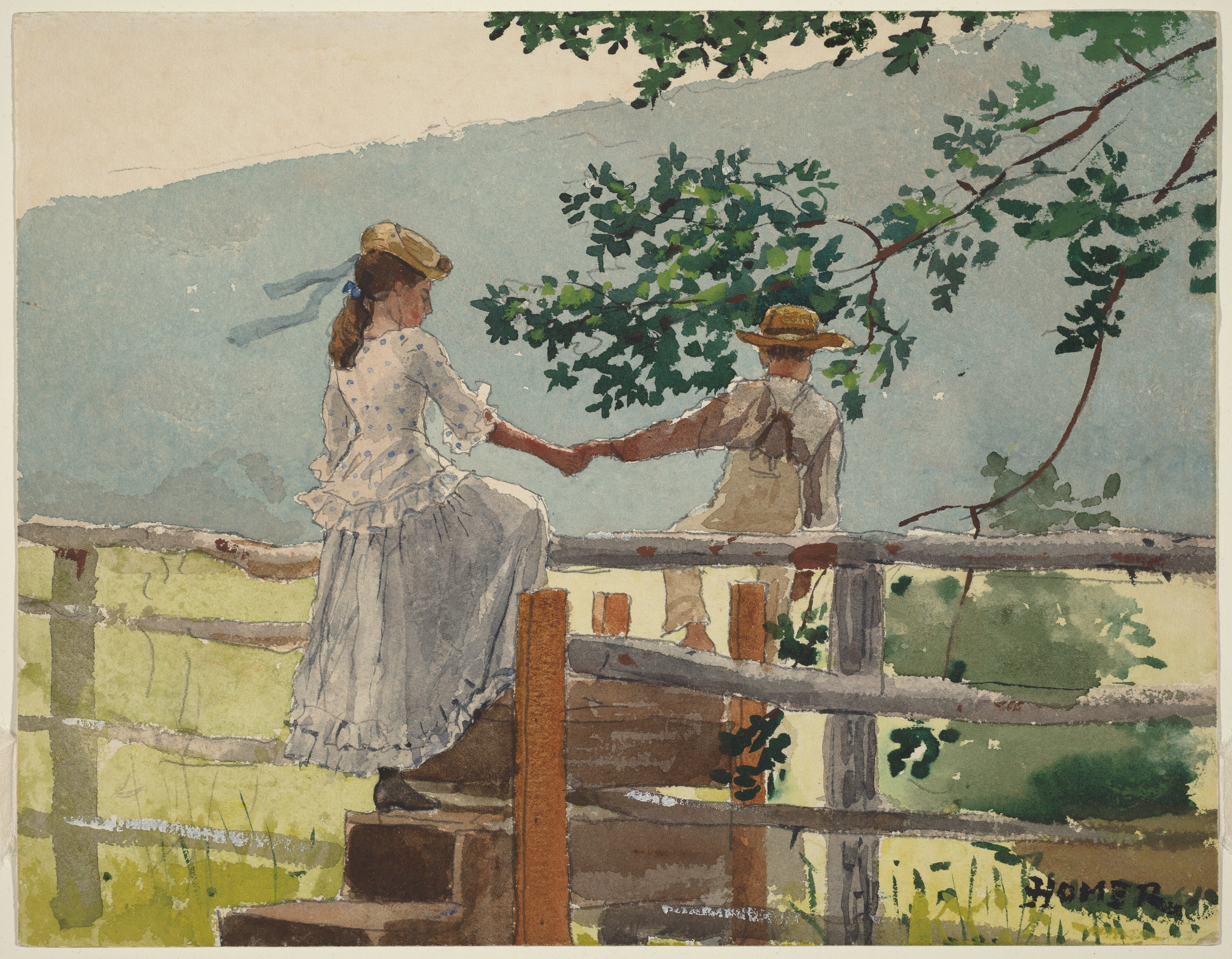
On the Stile, c. 1878

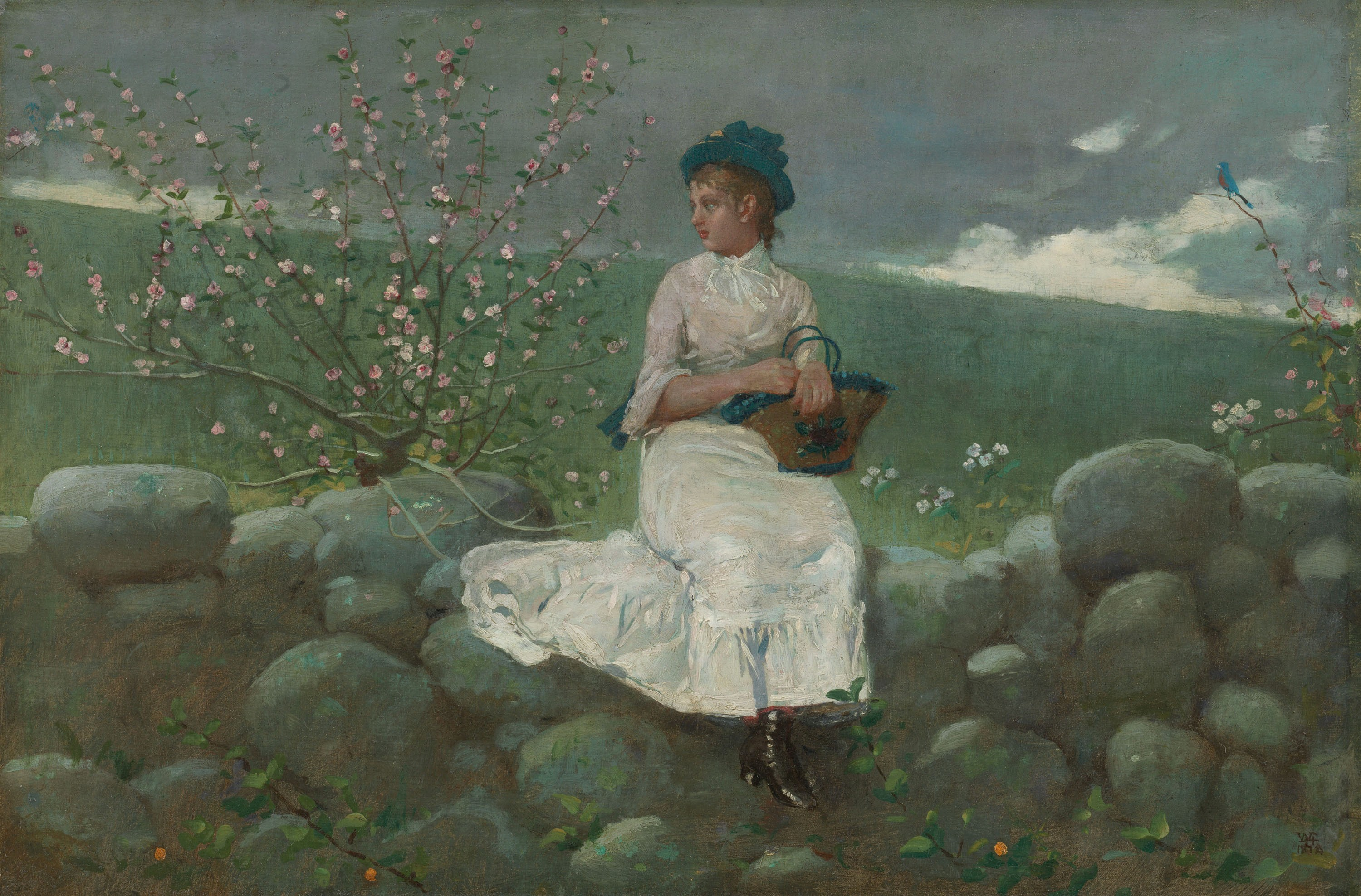
Peach Blossoms, 1878

== Life in the United Kingdom ==
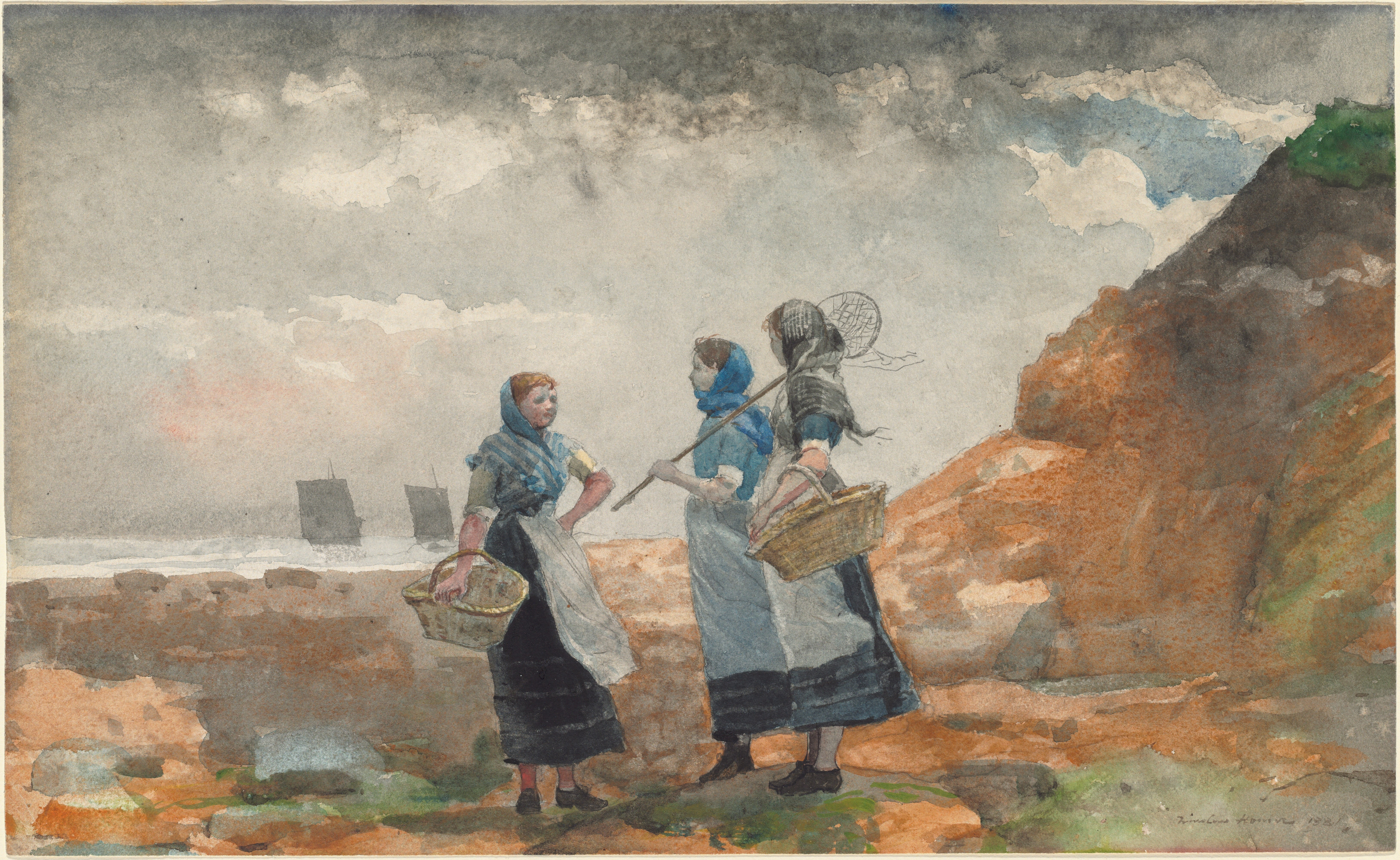
Three Fisher Girls, Tynemouth, watercolor on paper 1881, National Gallery of Art, Washington D.C.

Homer spent two years (1881–1882) in the coastal village of Cullercoats, Northumberland. Many of the paintings at Cullercoats took as their subjects working men and women and their daily heroism, imbued with a solidity and sobriety which was new to Homer's art, presaging the direction of his future work. He wrote, "The women are the working bees. Stout hardy creatures." His works from this period are almost exclusively watercolors. His palette became constrained and sober; his paintings larger, more ambitious, and more deliberately conceived and executed. His subjects more universal and less nationalistic, more heroic by virtue of his unsentimental rendering. Although he moved away from the spontaneity and bright innocence of the American paintings of the 1860s and 1870s, Homer found a new style and vision which carried his talent into new realms.

== Maine and maturity ==
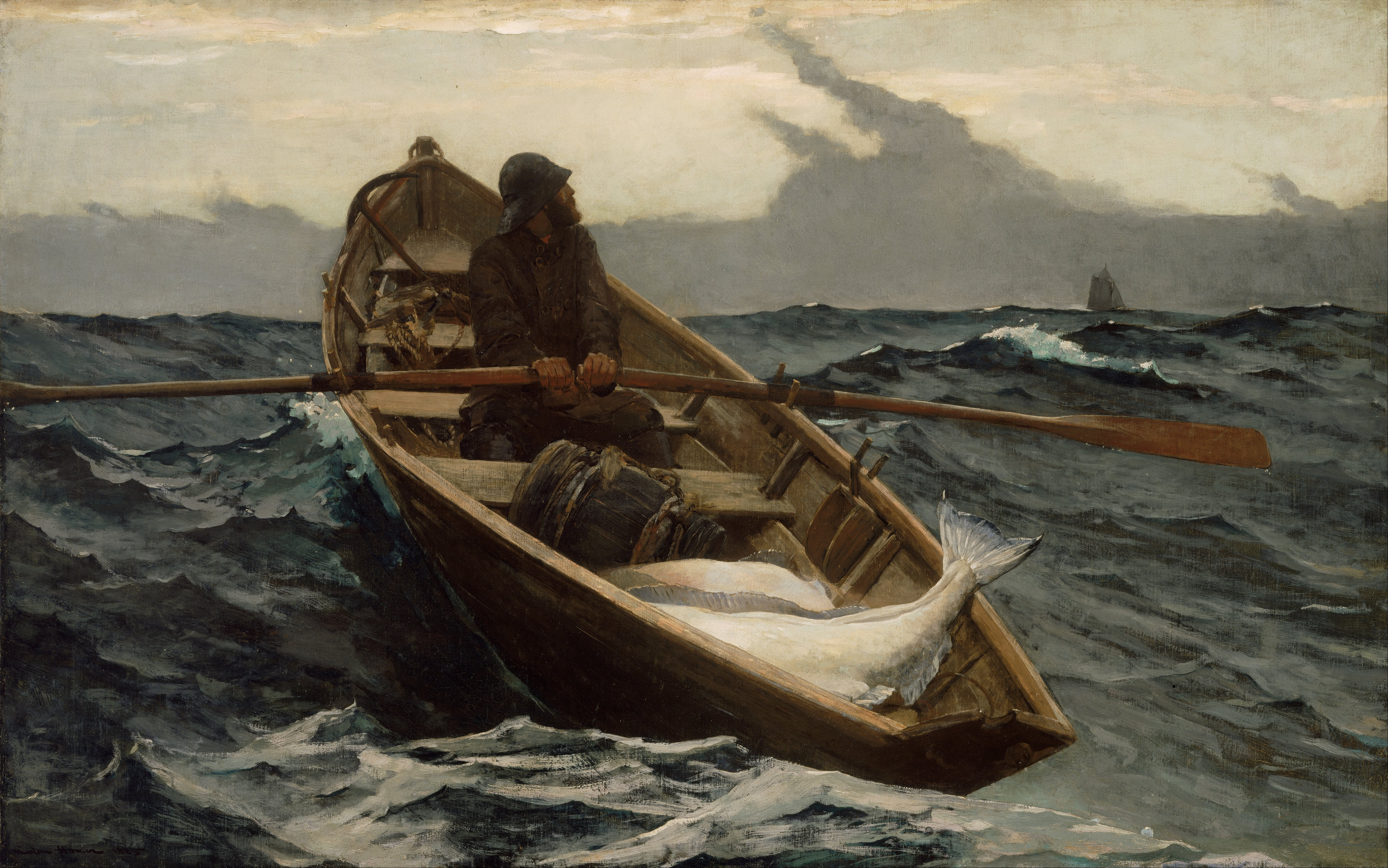
The Fog Warning (1885; Museum of Fine Arts, Boston)

Back in the U.S. in November 1882, Homer showed his English watercolors in New York. Critics noticed the change in style at once, "He is a very different Homer from the one we knew in days gone by", now his pictures "touch a far higher plane ... They are works of High Art." Homer's women were no longer "dolls who flaunt their millinery" but "sturdy, fearless, fit wives and mothers of men" who are fully capable of enduring the forces and vagaries of nature alongside their men.

In 1883, Homer moved to Prouts Neck, Maine (in Scarborough), and lived at his family's estate in the remodeled carriage house seventy-five feet from the ocean. During the rest of the mid-1880s, Homer painted his monumental sea scenes. In Undertow (1886), depicting the dramatic rescue of two female bathers by two male lifeguards, Homer's figures "have the weight and authority of classical figures". In Eight Bells (1886), two sailors carefully take their bearings on deck, calmly appraising their position and by extension, their relationship with the sea; they are confident in their seamanship but respectful of the forces before them. Other notable paintings among these dramatic struggle-with-nature images are Banks Fisherman, The Gulf Stream, Rum Cay, Mending the Nets, and Searchlight on Harbor Entrance, Santiago de Cuba. Some of these he repeated as etchings.

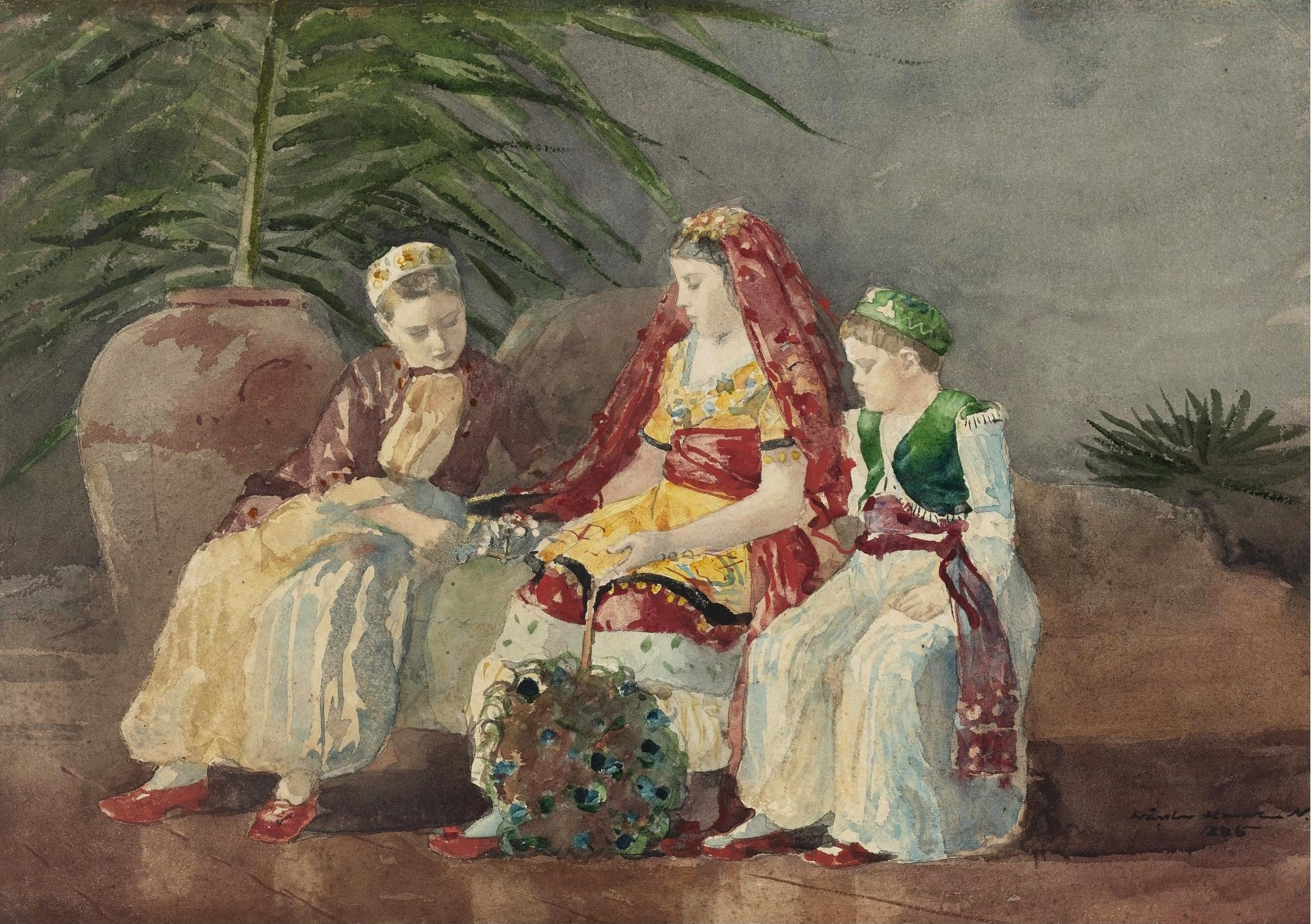
Winslow Homer's Children Under a Palm Tree, 1885

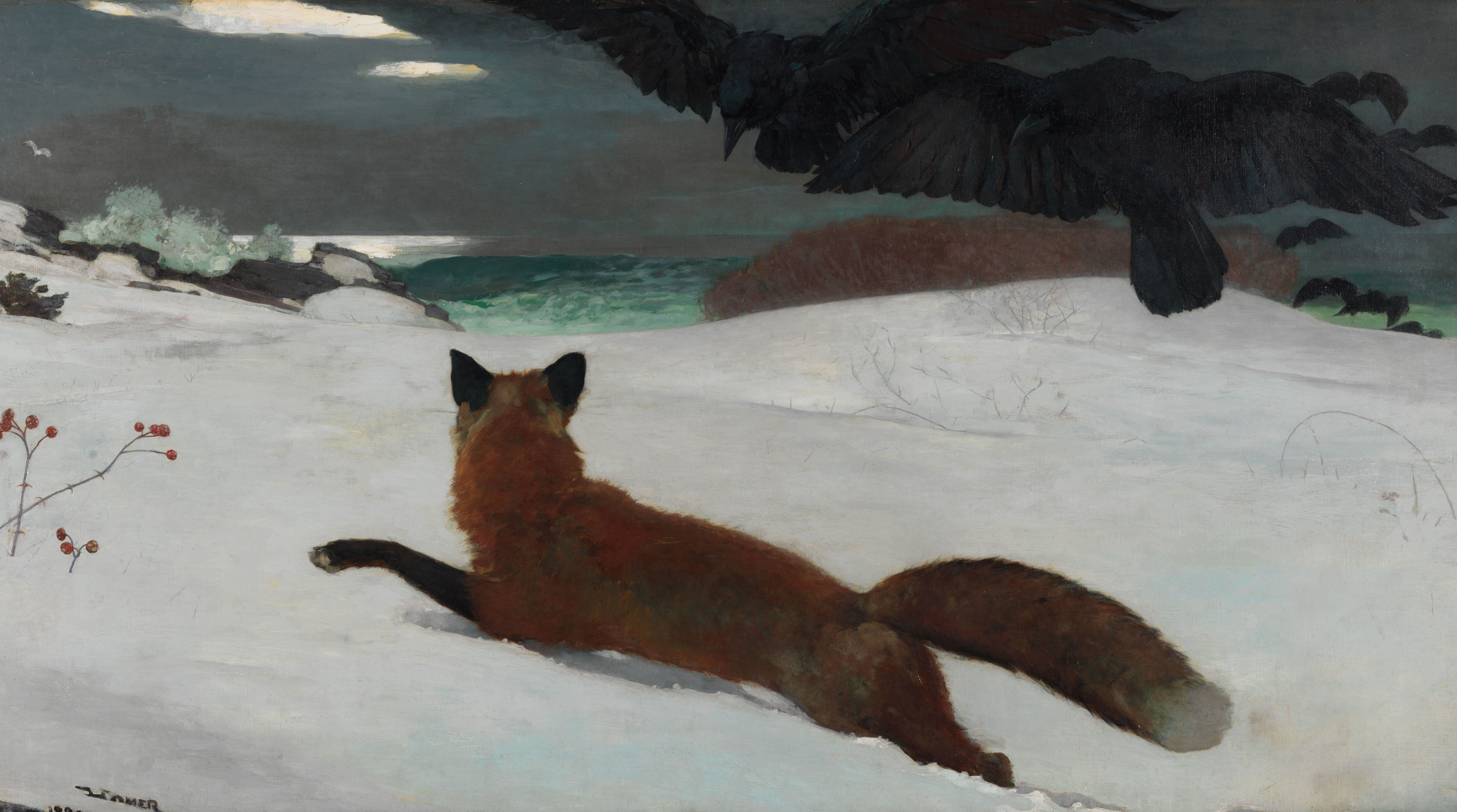
The Fox Hunt, 1893. Oil on canvas, 96.5 x 174 cm. Pennsylvania Academy of the Fine Arts.

At fifty years of age, Homer had become a "Yankee Robinson Crusoe, cloistered on his art island" and "a hermit with a brush". These paintings established Homer, as the New York Evening Post wrote, "in a place by himself as the most original and one of the strongest of American painters." But despite his critical recognition, Homer's work never achieved the popularity of traditional Salon pictures or of the flattering portraits by John Singer Sargent. Many of the sea pictures took years to sell and Undertow only earned him $400.

In these years, Homer received emotional sustenance primarily from his mother, brother Charles, and sister-in-law Martha ("Mattie"). After his mother's death, Homer became a "parent" for his aging but domineering father and Mattie became his closest female intimate. In the winters of 1884–5, Homer ventured to warmer locations in Florida, Cuba, and the Bahamas and did a series of watercolors as part of a commission for Century Magazine. He replaced the turbulent green storm-tossed sea of Prouts Neck with the sparkling blue skies of the Caribbean and the hardy New Englanders with Black natives, further expanding his watercolor technique, subject matter, and palette. During this trip he painted Children Under a Palm Tree for Edith Blake, the wife of Henry Arthur Blake, the then-governor of The Bahamas. His tropical stays inspired and refreshed him in much the same way as Paul Gauguin's trips to Tahiti.

Children Under a Palm Tree was re-discovered on an episode of Antiques Roadshow in 2008, and was formally attributed to Homer on BBC's television series Fake or Fortune? by Philip Mould and Fiona Bruce. Ownership of the painting remains an on-going controversy.

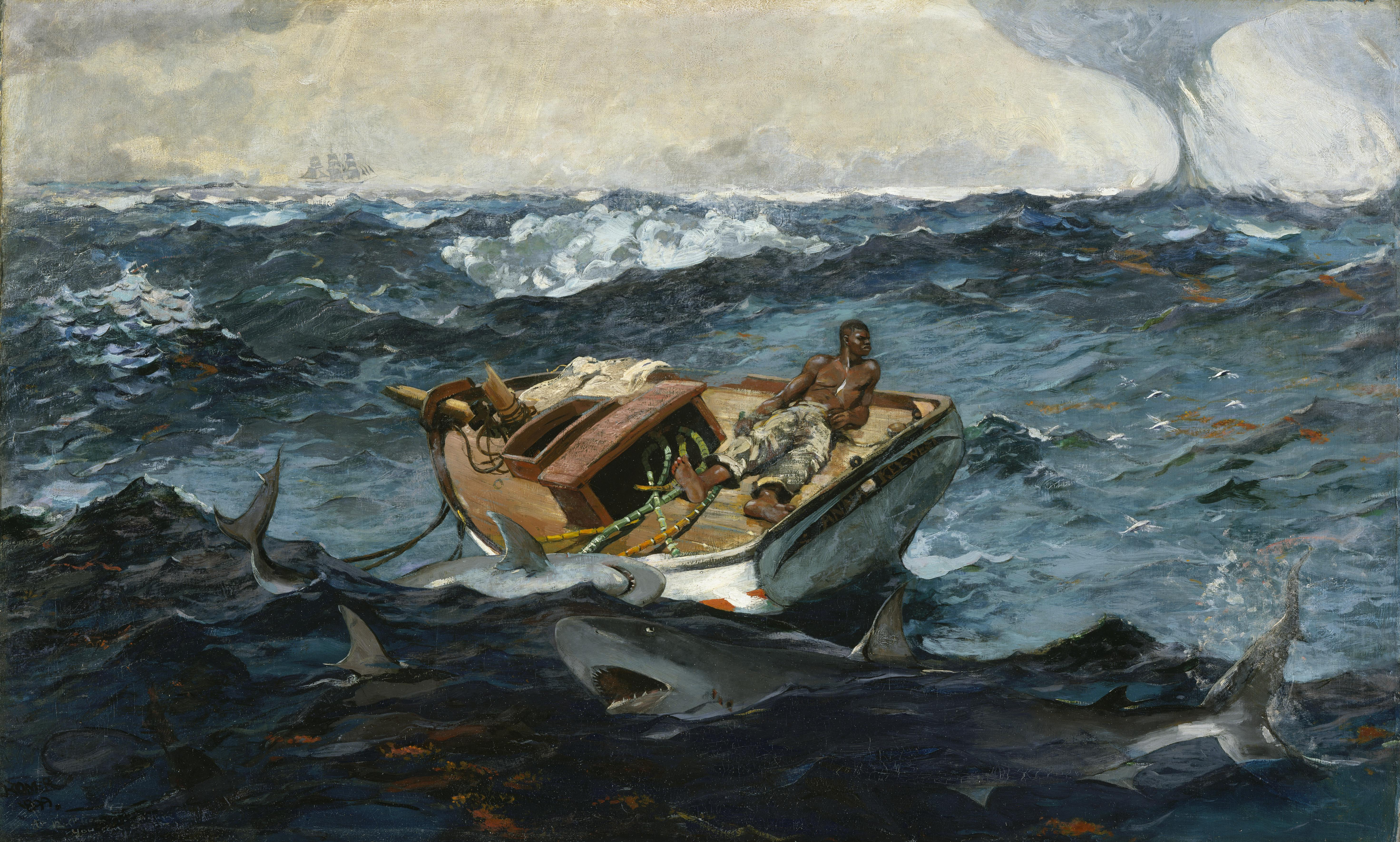
The Gulf Stream, 1899, oil on canvas, Metropolitan Museum of Art, New York City

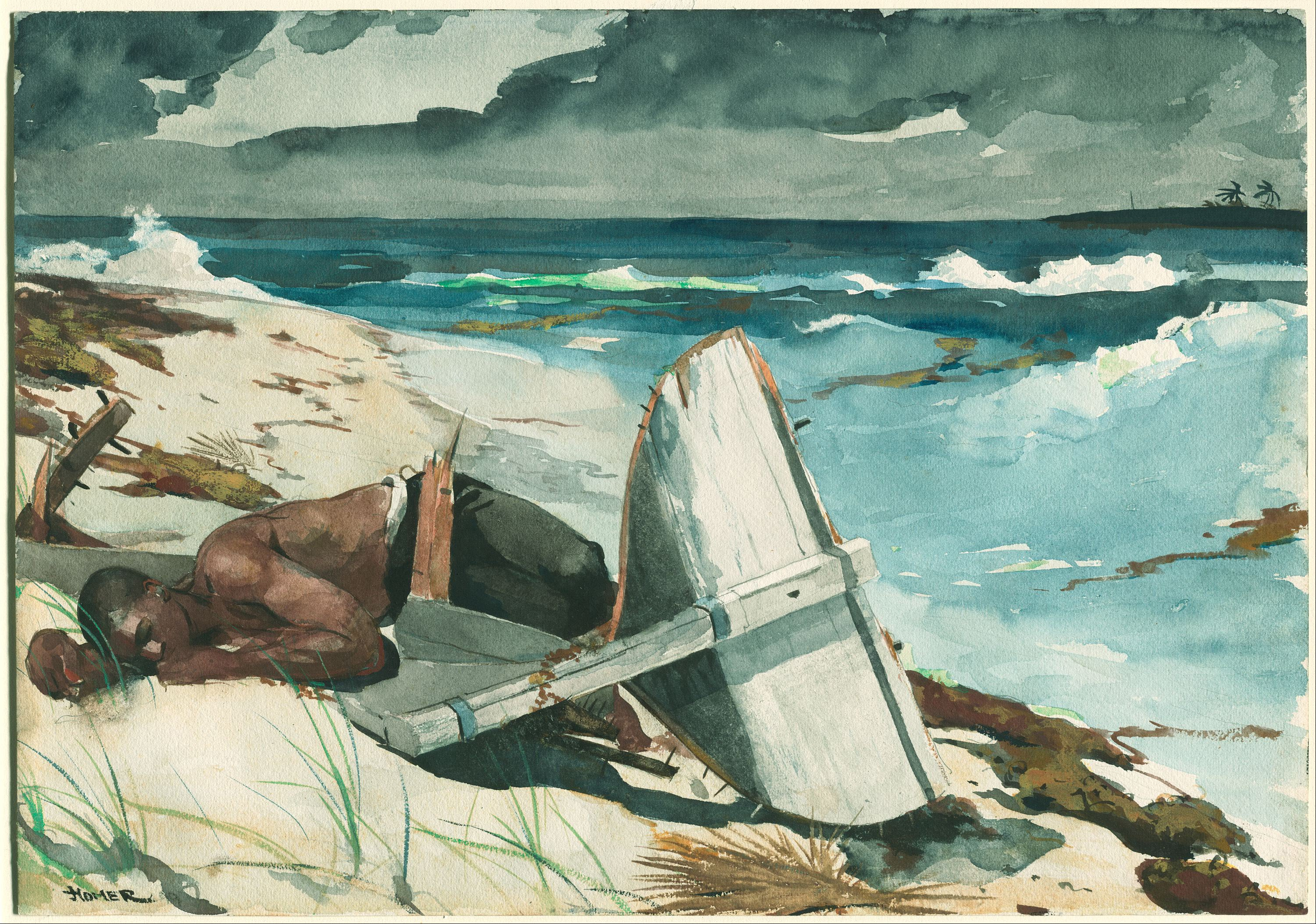
After the Hurricane, 1899 painting of a man lying on a beach next to his destroyed boat in the Bahamas

A Garden in Nassau (1885) is one of the best examples of these watercolors. Once again, his freshness and originality were praised by critics but proved too advanced for the traditional art buyers and he "looked in vain for profits". Homer lived frugally, however, and fortunately his affluent brother Charles provided financial help when needed.

Homer frequently visited Key West, Florida, between 1888 and 1903. Some of his best-known works, A Norther, Key West, The Gulf Stream, Taking on Wet Provisions, and Palms in the Storm, are said to have been produced there.

Homer found inspiration in summer trips to the North Woods Club, near the hamlet of Minerva, New York, in the Adirondack Mountains. It was on these fishing vacations that he experimented with the watercolor medium, producing works of the utmost vigor and subtlety, hymns to solitude, nature, and to outdoor life. Homer does not shrink from the savagery of blood sports nor the struggle for survival. The color effects are boldly and facilely applied. In terms of quality and invention, Homer's achievements as a watercolorist are unparalleled: "Homer had used his singular vision and manner of painting to create a body of work that has not been matched."

In 1893, Homer painted one of his most famous "Darwinian" works, The Fox Hunt, which depicts a flock of starving crows descending on a fox slowed by deep snow. This was Homer's largest painting, and it was immediately purchased by the Pennsylvania Academy of the Fine Arts, his first painting in a major American museum collection. In Huntsman and Dogs (1891), a lone, impassive hunter, with his yelping dogs at his side, heads home after a hunt with deer skins slung over his right shoulder. Another late work, The Gulf Stream (1899), shows a black sailor adrift in a damaged boat, surrounded by sharks as a waterspout approaches.

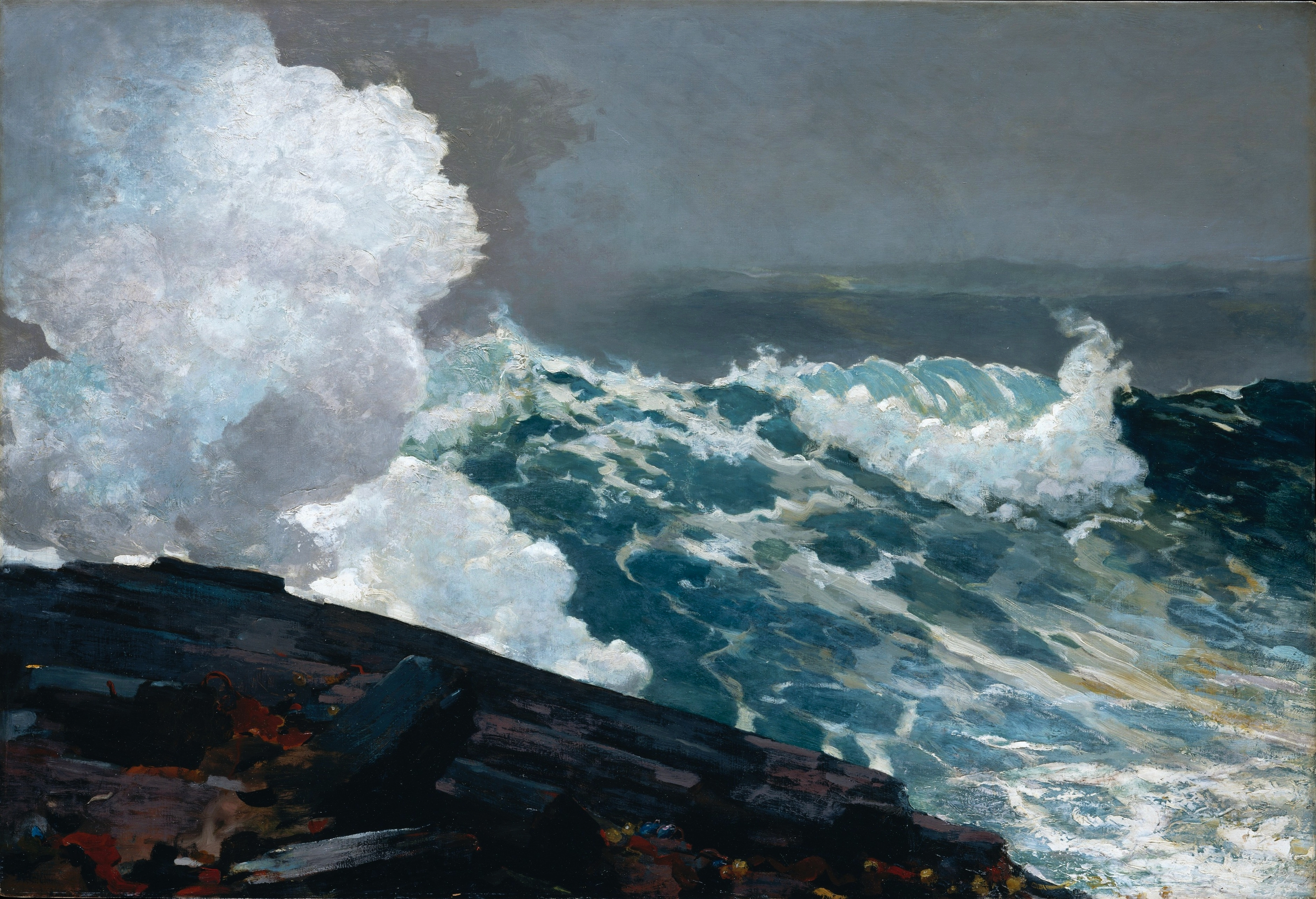
Northeaster, 1895

By 1900, Homer finally reached financial stability, as his paintings fetched good prices from museums and he began to receive rents from real estate properties. He also became free of the responsibilities of caring for his father, who had died two years earlier. Homer continued producing excellent watercolors, mostly on trips to Canada and the Caribbean. Other late works include sporting scenes such as Right and Left, as well as seascapes absent of human figures, mostly of waves crashing against rocks in varying light. His late seascapes are especially valued for their dramatic and forceful expression of nature's powers, and for their beauty and intensity.

In his last decade, he at times followed the advice he had given a student artist in 1907: "Leave rocks for your old age—they're easy."

Homer died in 1910 at the age of 74 in his Prouts Neck studio and was interred in the Mount Auburn Cemetery in Cambridge, Massachusetts. His painting, Shooting the Rapids, Saguenay River, remains unfinished.

His Prouts Neck studio, a National Historic Landmark, is owned by the Portland Museum of Art, which offers tours.

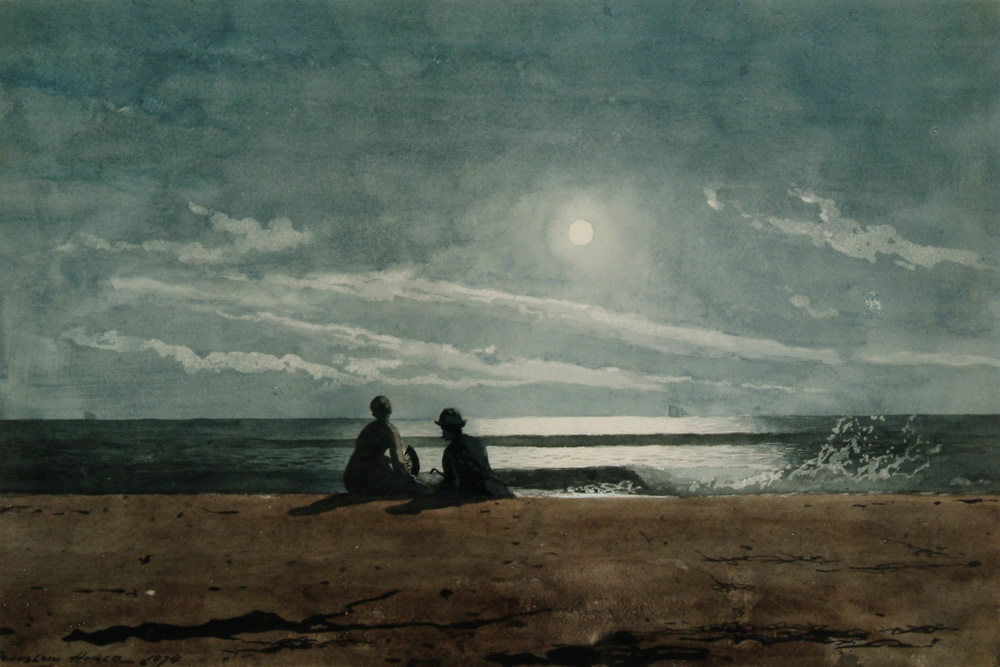
Moonlight, 1874

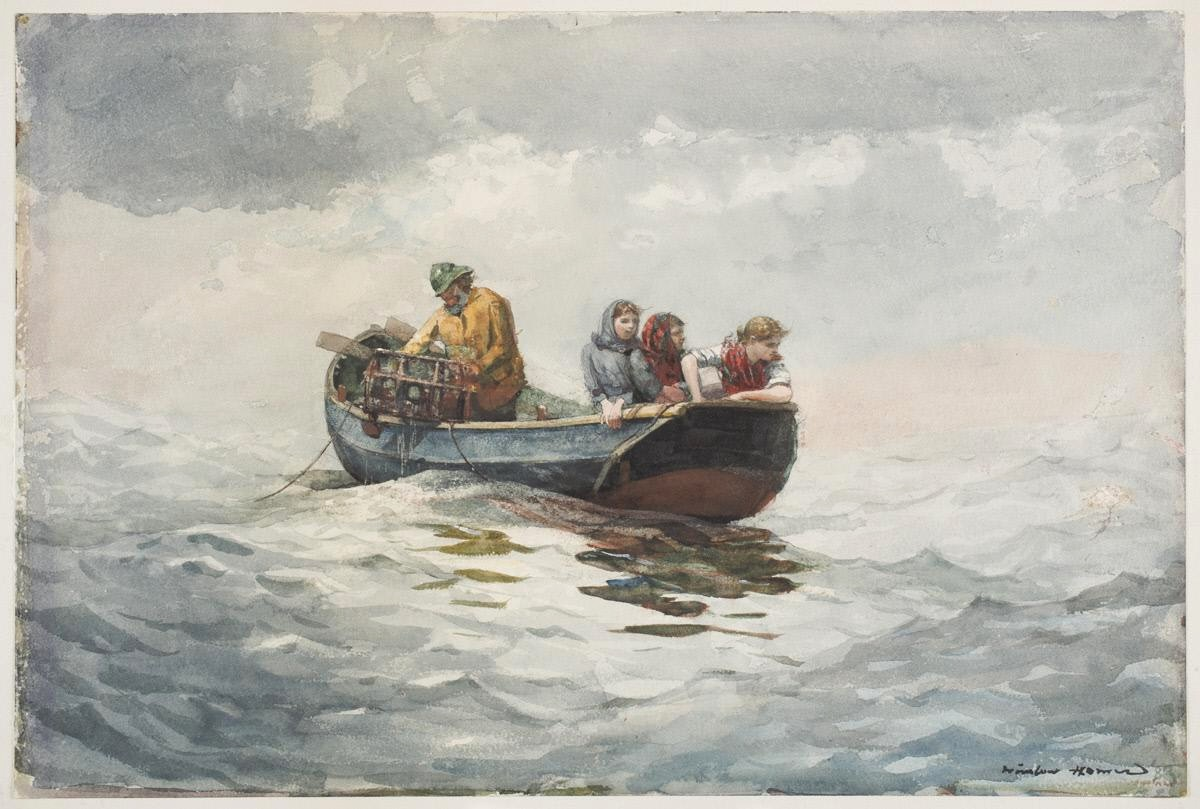
Crab Fishing, 1883

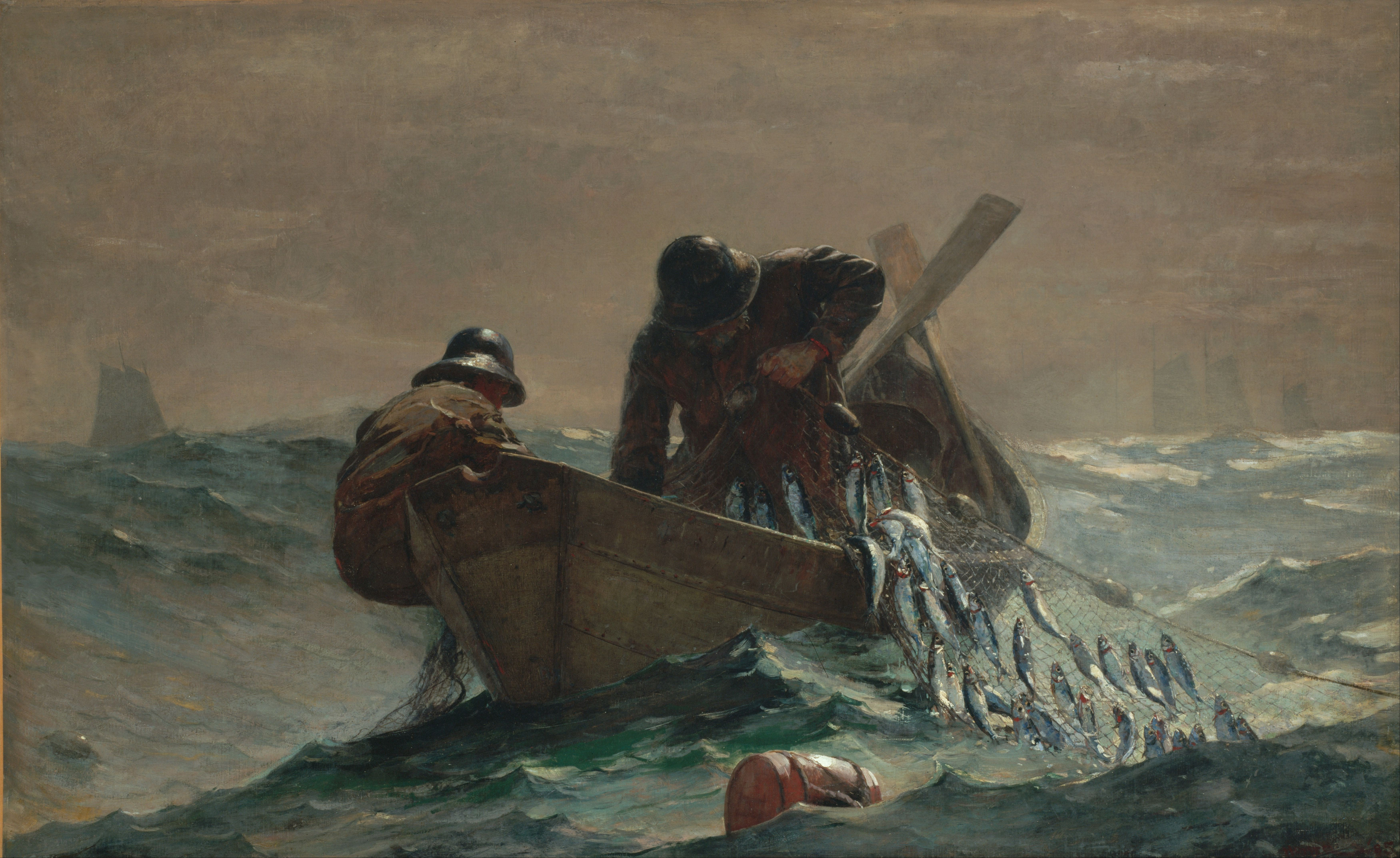
The Herring Net, 1885

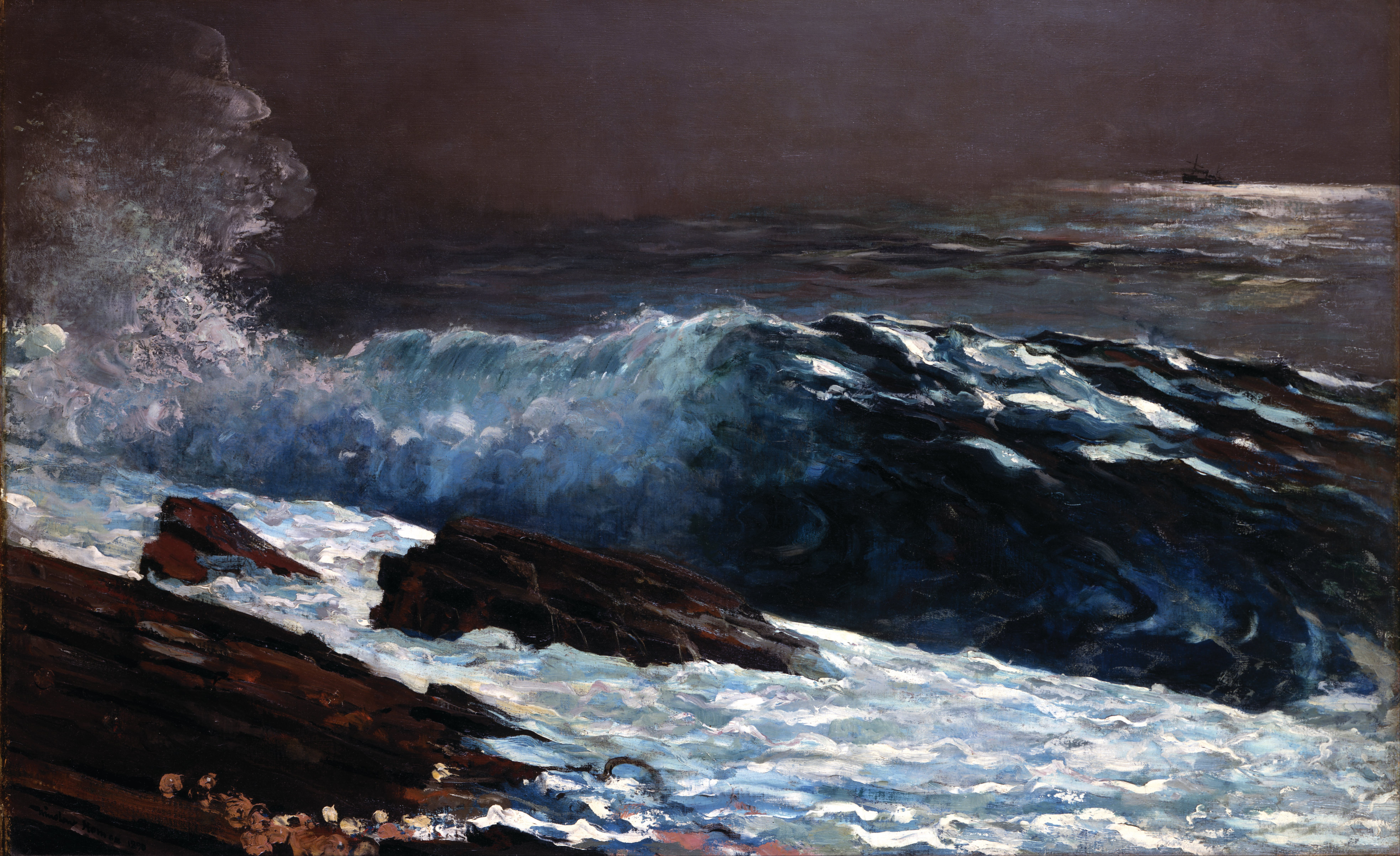
Sunlight on the Coast, 1890
(Toledo Museum of Art, Ohio)

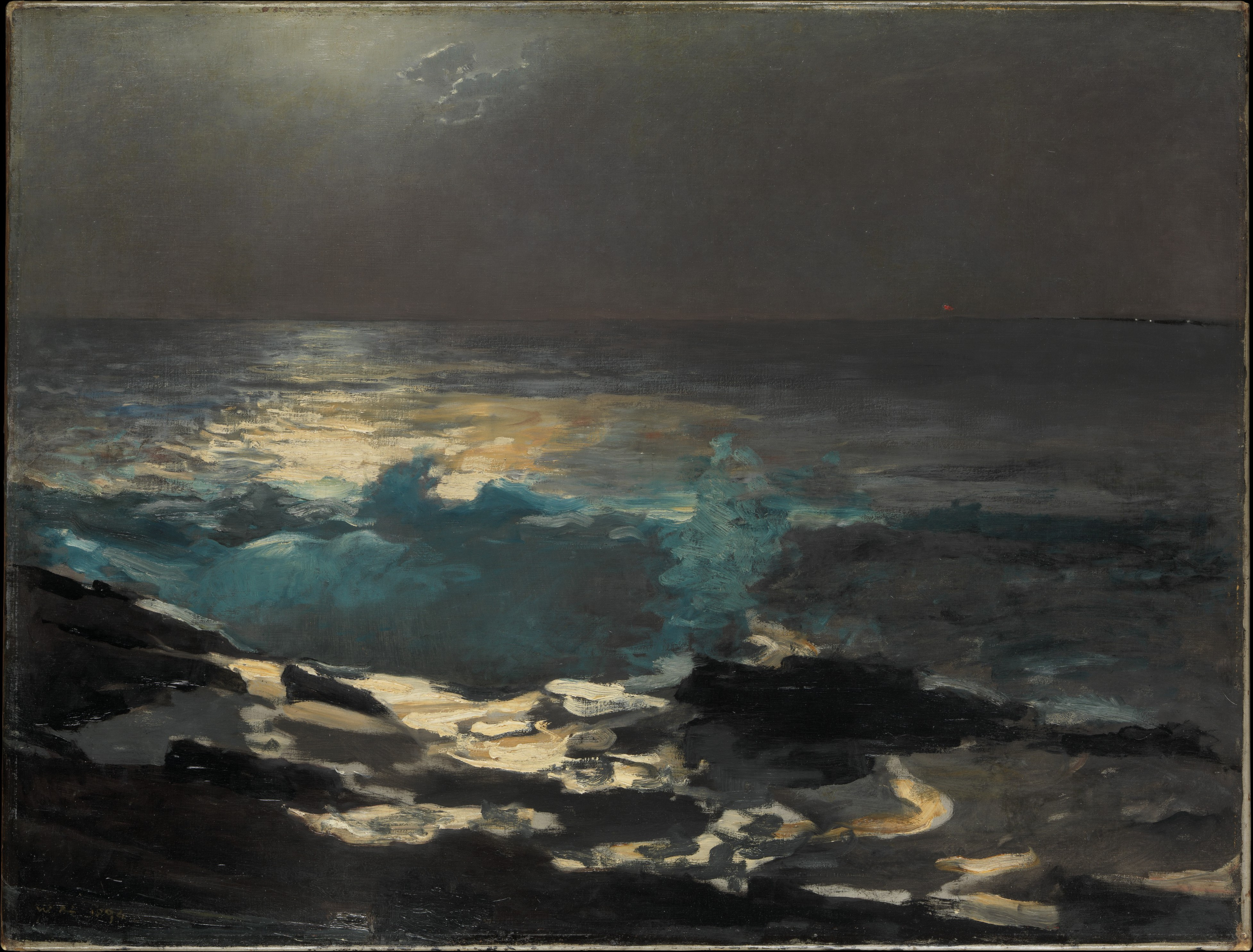
Moonlight, Wood Island Light, 1894, Metropolitan Museum of Art

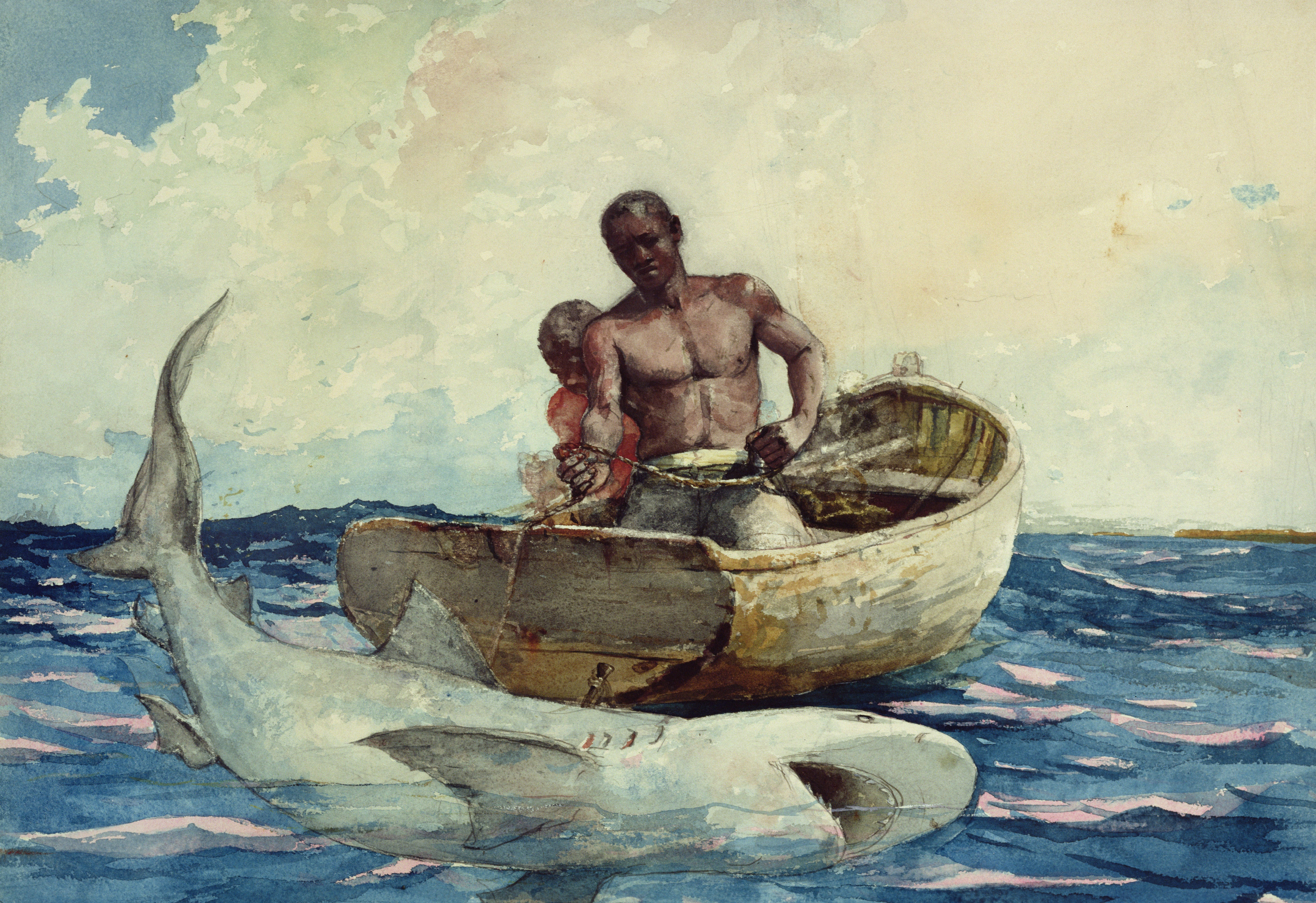
Shark Fishing, 1885

== Influence ==
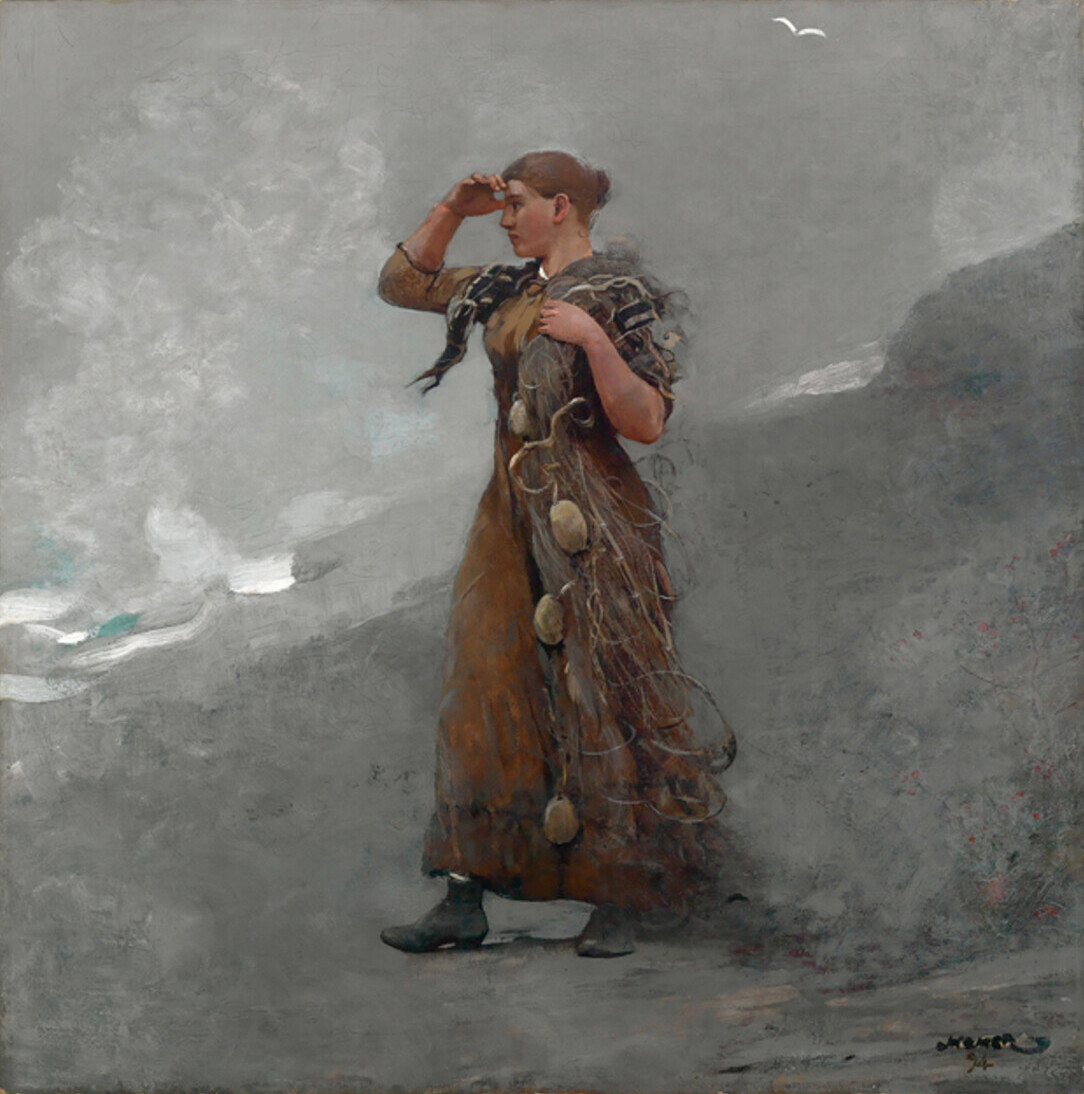
The Fisher Girl, 1894

Homer never taught in a school or privately, as did Thomas Eakins, but his works strongly influenced succeeding generations of American painters for their direct and energetic interpretation of man's stoic relationship to an often neutral and sometimes harsh wilderness. Robert Henri called Homer's work an "integrity of nature".

American illustrator and teacher Howard Pyle revered Homer and encouraged his students to study him. His student and fellow illustrator, N. C. Wyeth (and through him Andrew Wyeth and Jamie Wyeth), shared the influence and appreciation, even following Homer to Maine for inspiration. The elder Wyeth's respect for his antecedent was "intense and absolute" and can be observed in his early work Mowing (1907). Perhaps Homer's austere individualism is best captured in his admonition to artists: "Look at nature, work independently, and solve your own problems."

== U.S. stamp ==
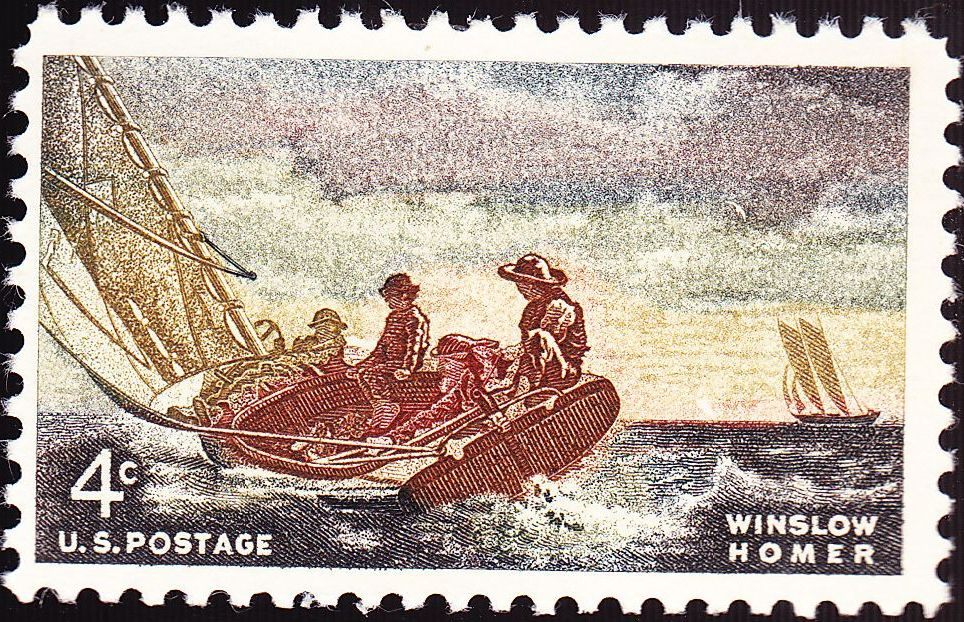
Winslow Homer commemorative issue of 1962

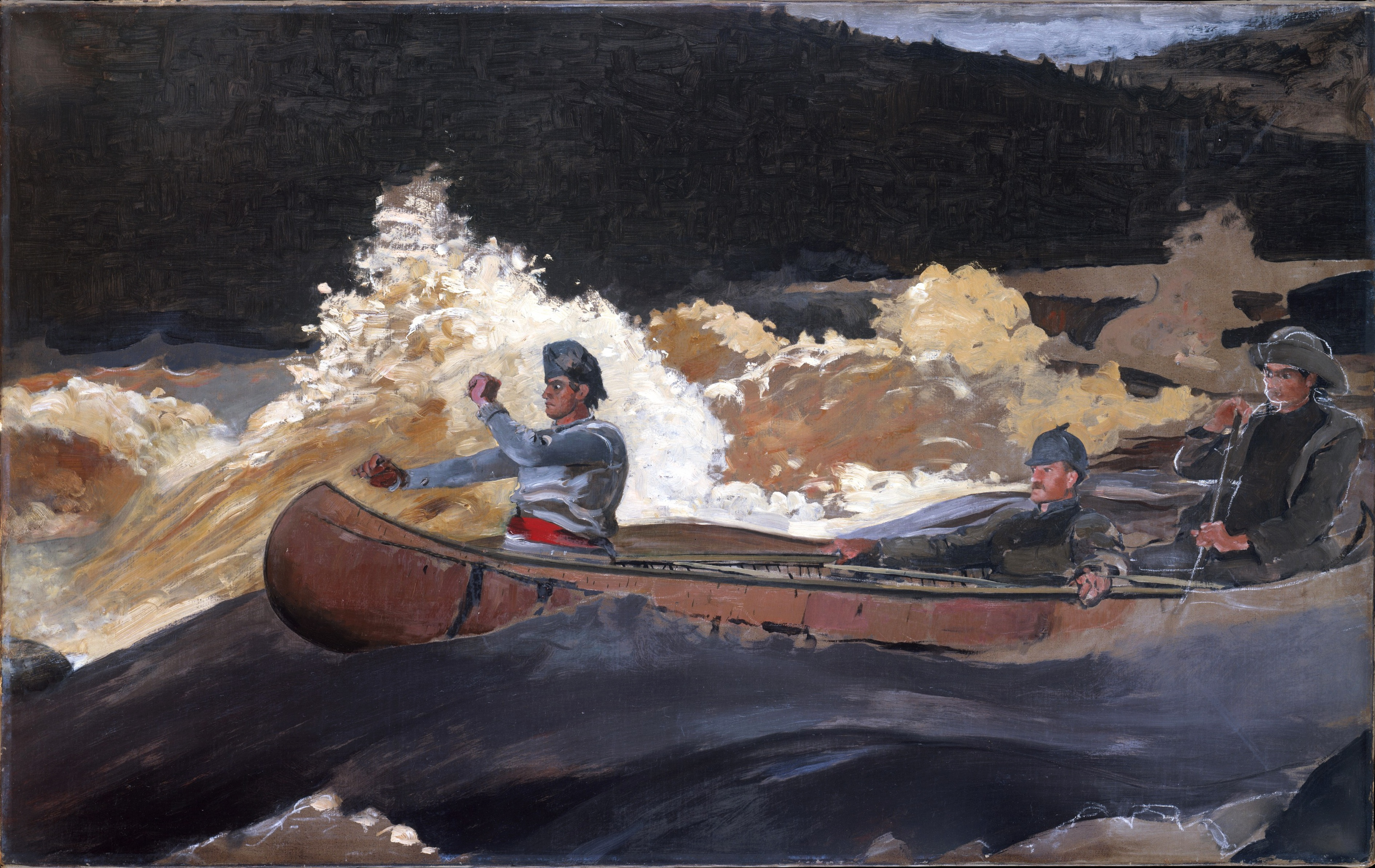
Shooting the Rapids, Saguenay River, unfinished (1910)

In 1962, the U.S. Post Office released a commemorative stamp honoring Winslow Homer. Homer's famous oil painting Breezing Up, hanging in the National Gallery in Washington, D.C., was chosen as the image for the design of this issue. On August 12, 2010, The Postal Service issued a 44-cent commemorative stamp featuring Homer's Boys in a Pasture at the APS Stamp Show in Richmond, Virginia.

This stamp was the ninth to be issued in a series entitled "American Treasures". The original painting is part of the Hayden Collection at the Museum of Fine Arts in Boston. It depicts two boys from Belmont, Massachusetts—John Carney and Patrick Keenan—who posed for the artist for 75 cents per day.

== Works ==
His work was part of the painting event in the art competition at the 1932 Summer Olympics. Unlike many artists who were well known for working in only one art medium, Winslow Homer was prominent in a variety of art media, as in the following examples:

Country life

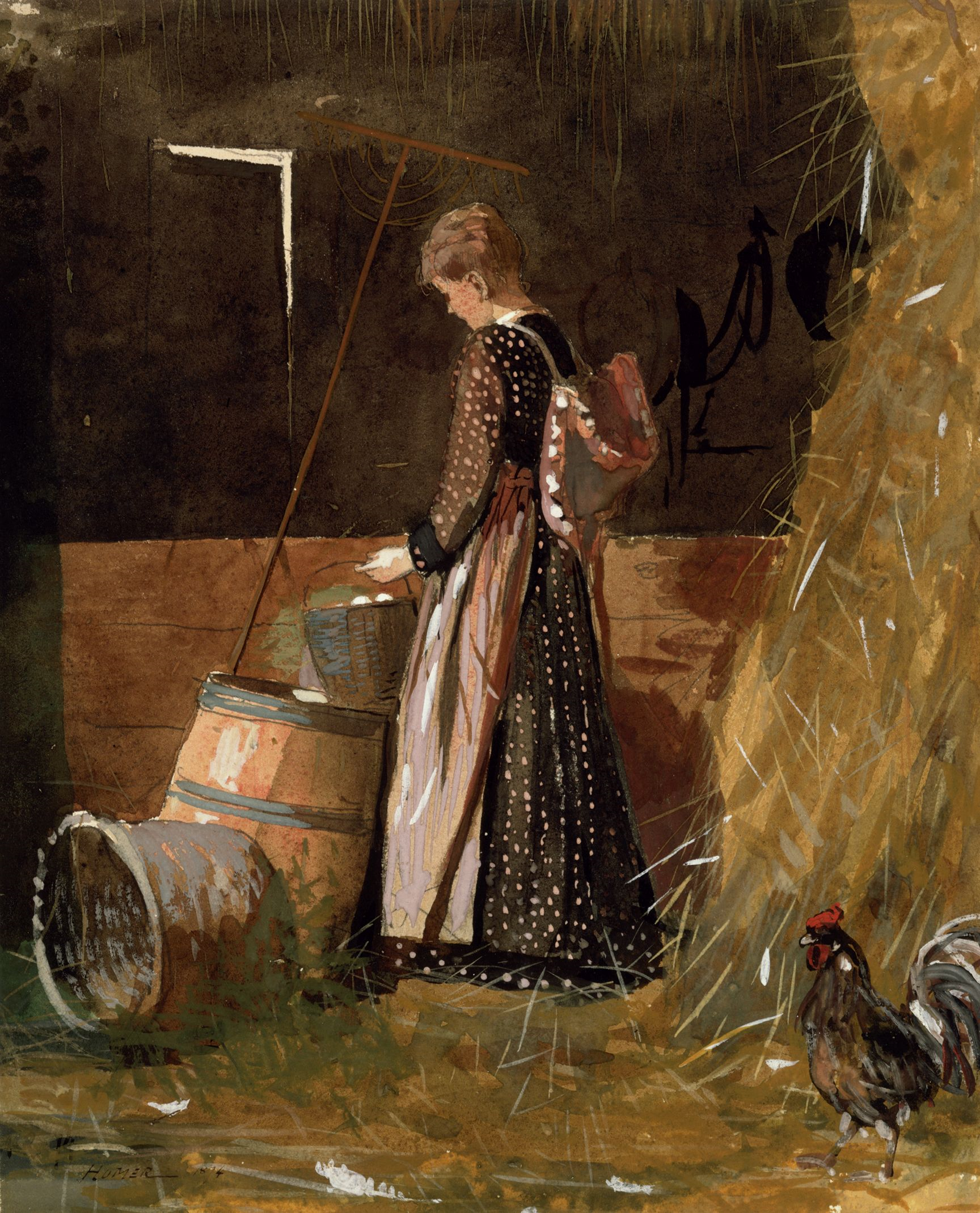
Fresh Eggs, 1874

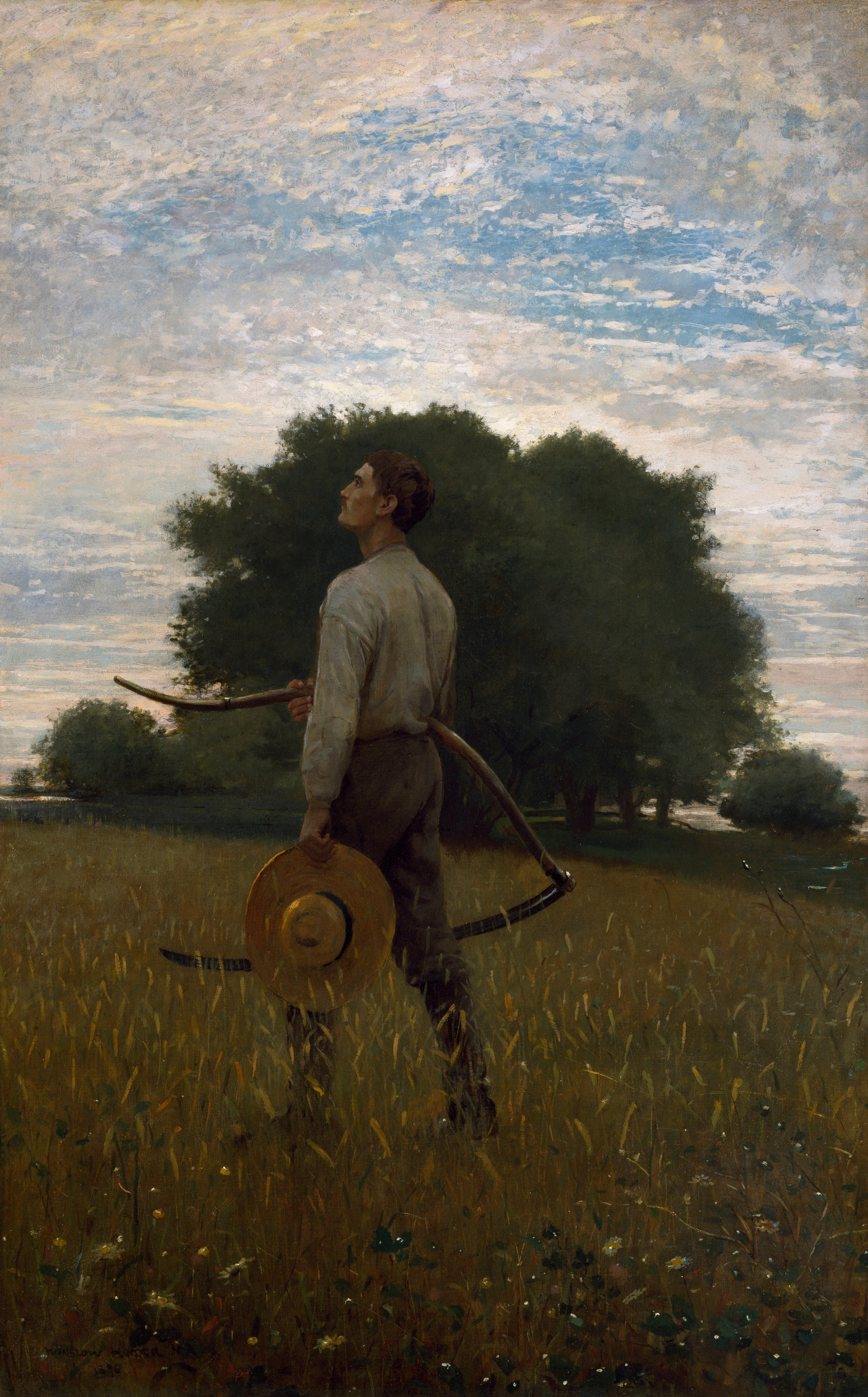
Song of the Lark, 1876, oil on canvas. Chrysler Museum of Art

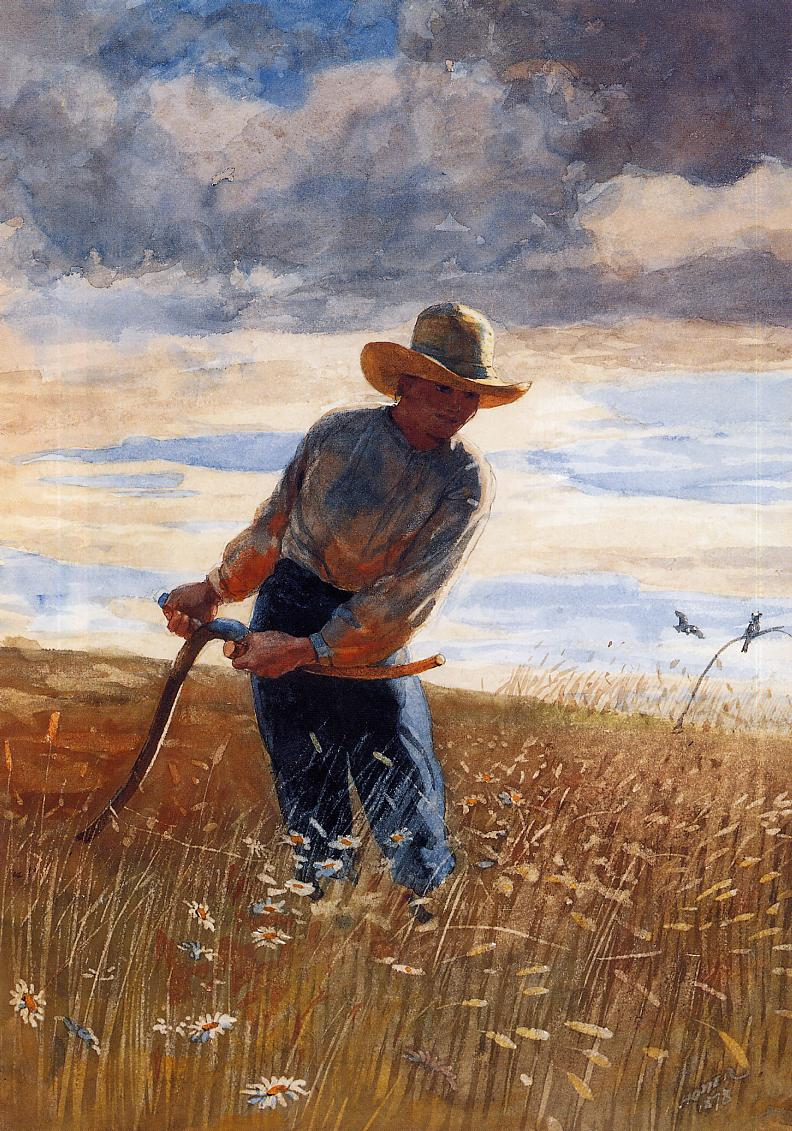
The Reaper, 1878

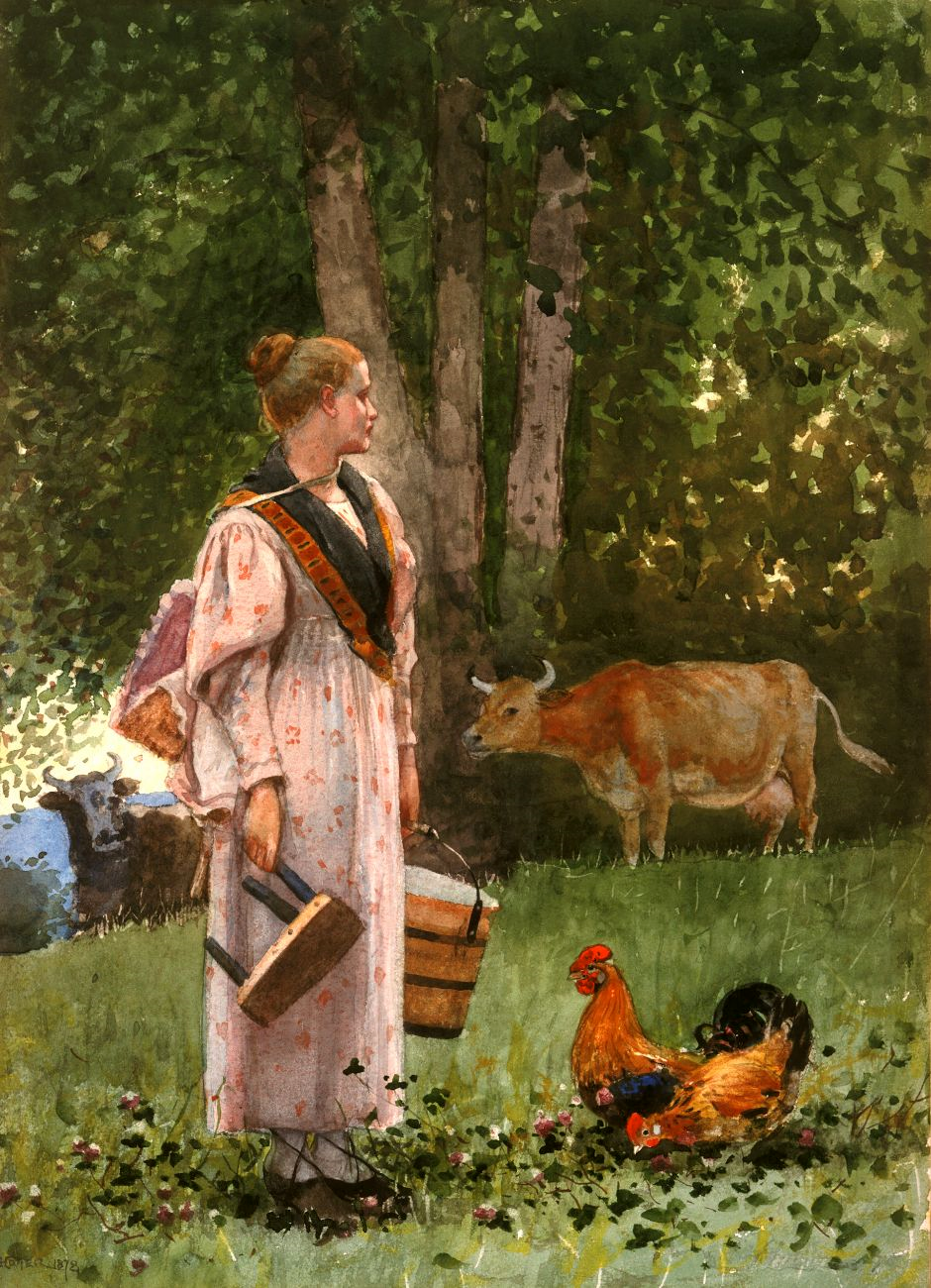
The Milk Maid, 1878

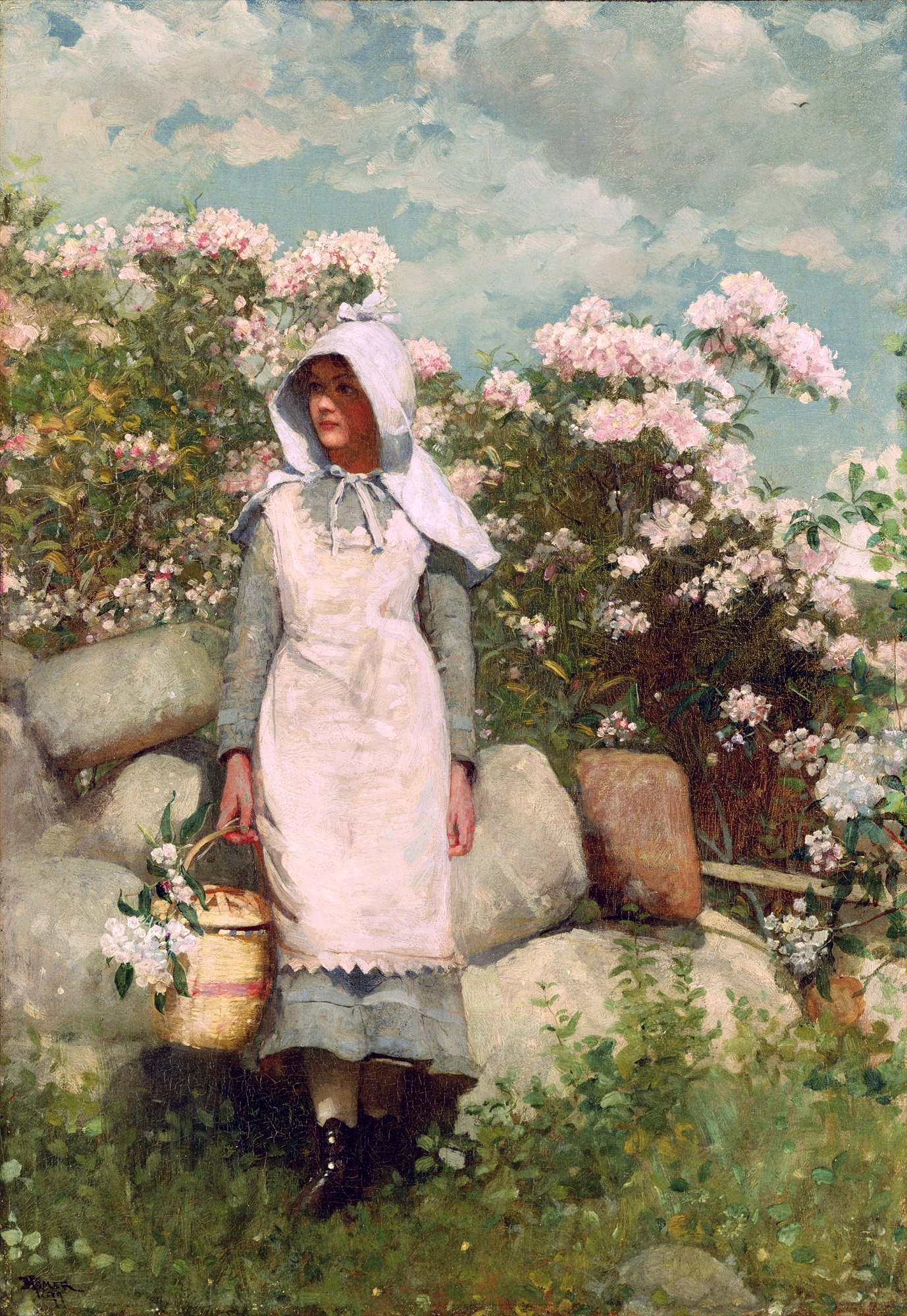
Girl and Laurel, 1879

Pastoral landscapes and lifestyle (see pastoralism) is a genre of literature, art and music that depicts shepherds herding livestock around open areas of land according to seasons and the changing availability of water and pasturage. A pastoral is a work of this genre.

Pastoral landscapes

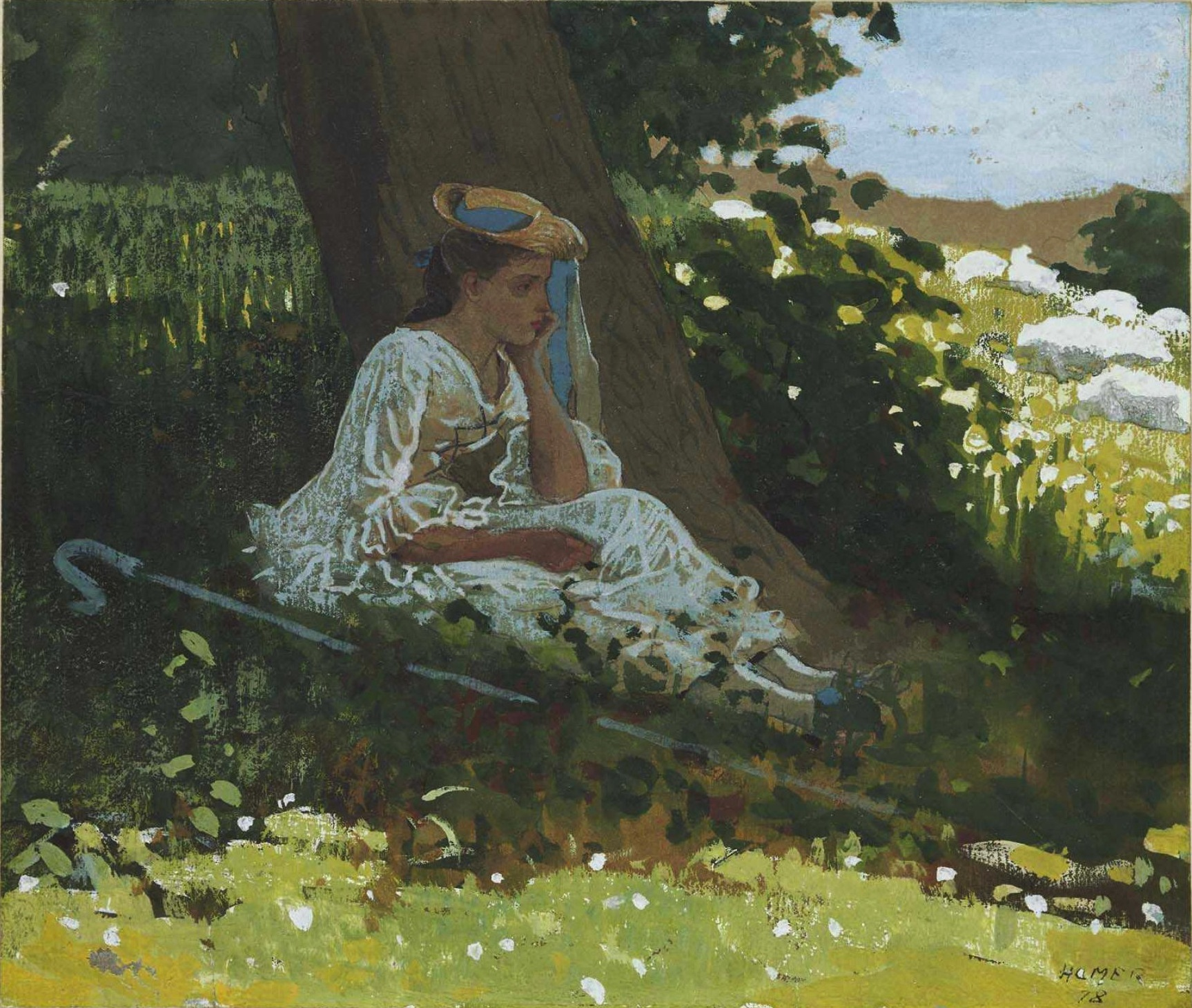
Bo-Peep, 1878

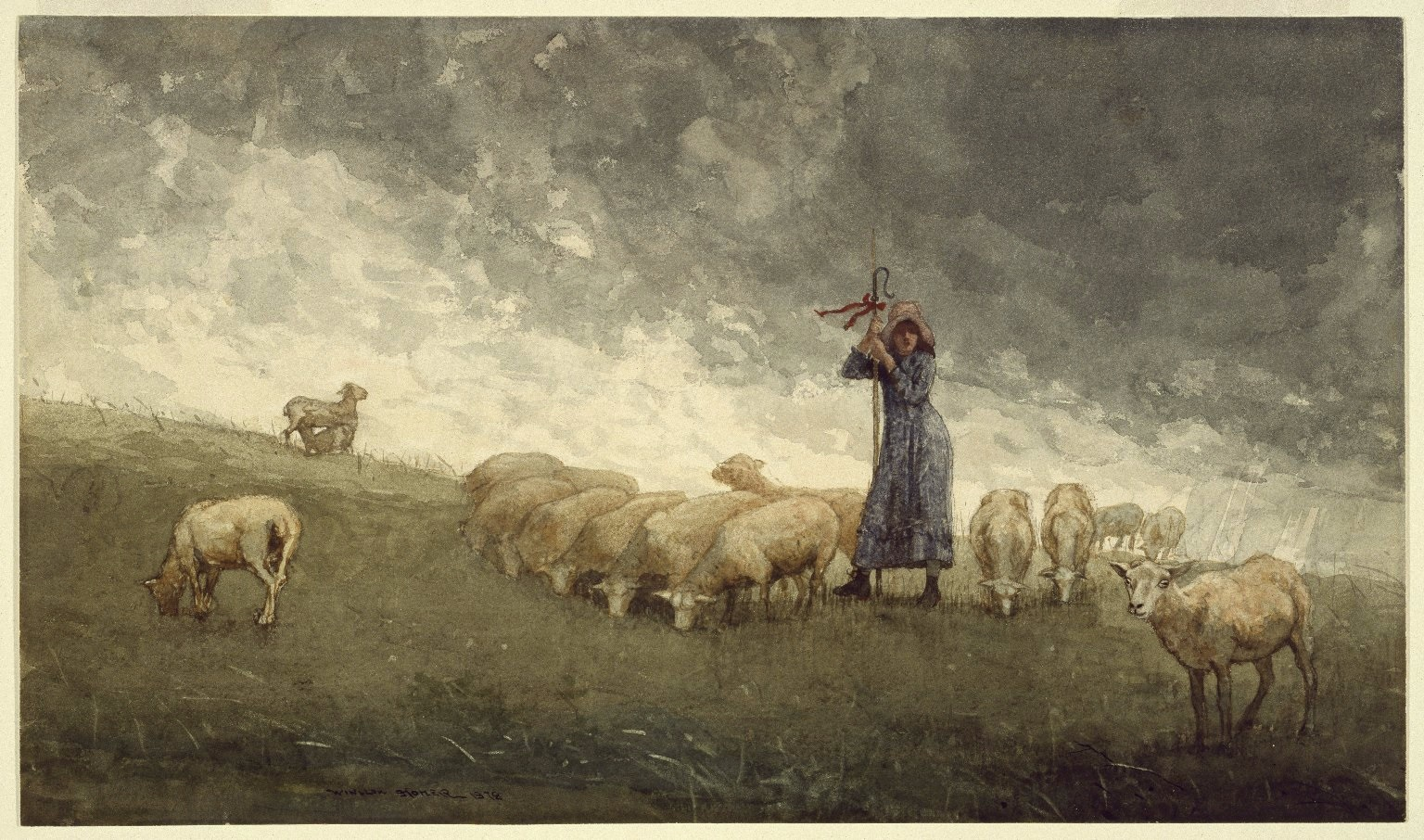
Shepherdess Tending Sheep, 1878

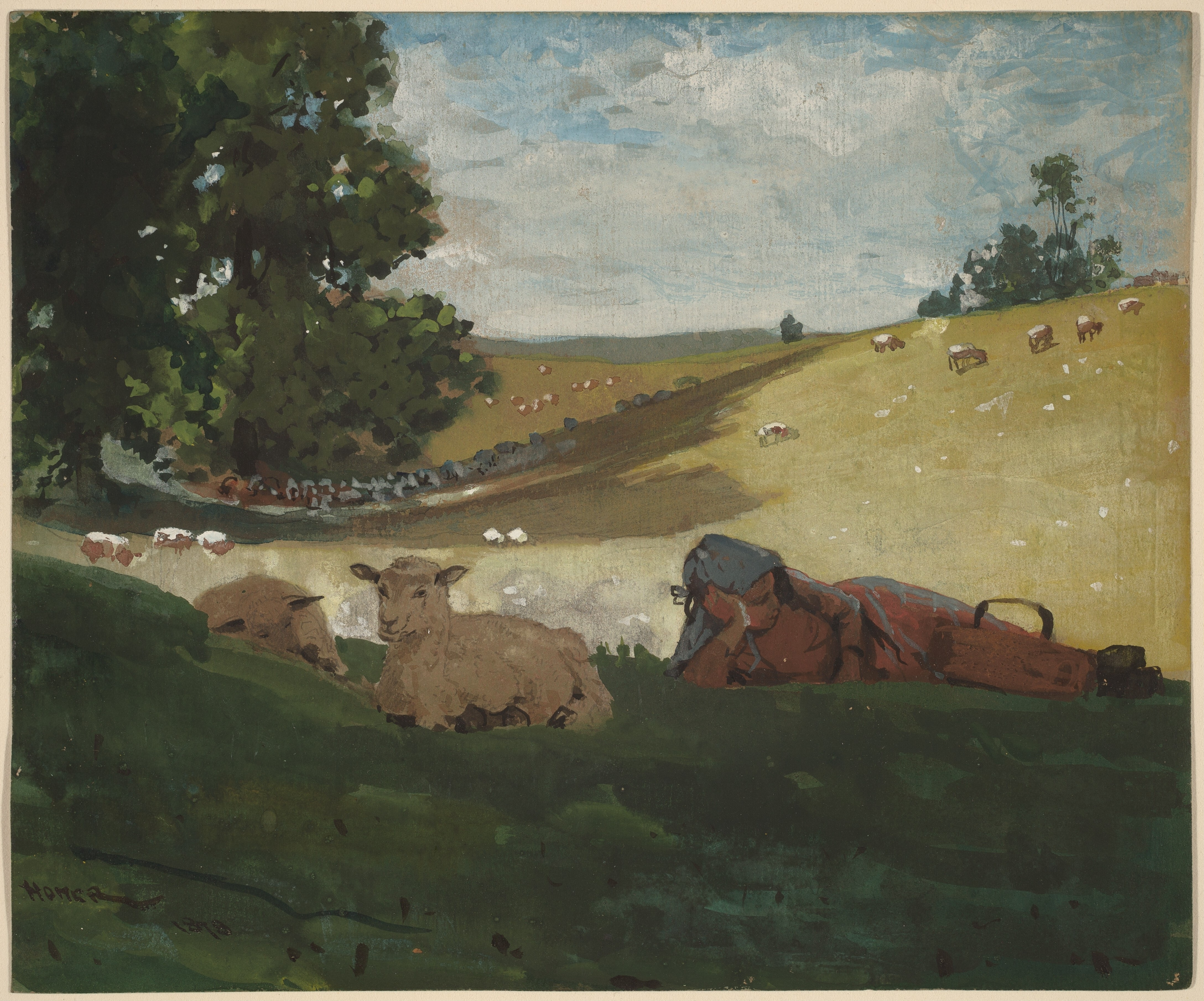
Warm Afternoon (Shepherdess), 1878

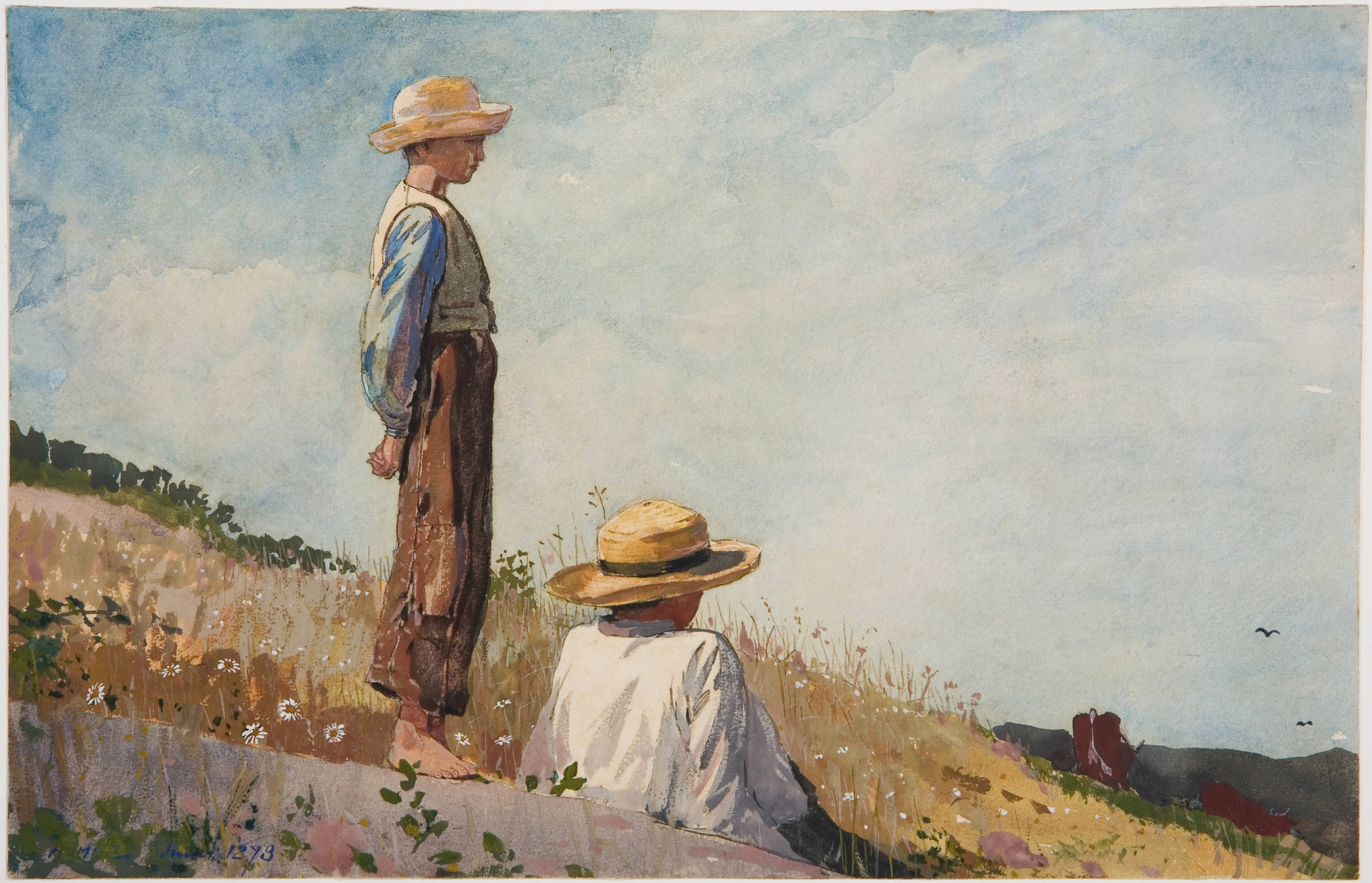
The Blue Boy, 1876

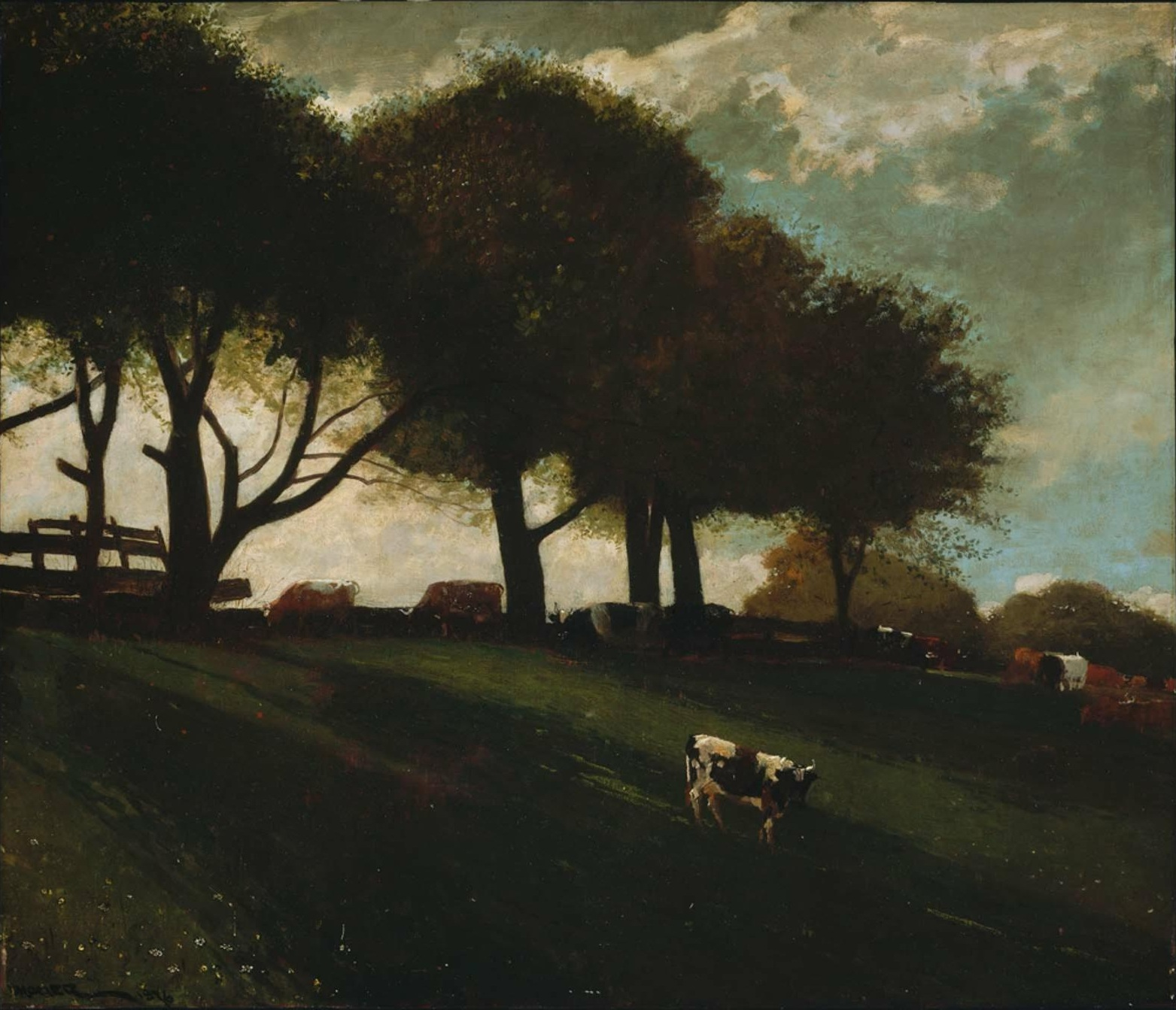
Twilight at Leeds, 1876

Winslow Homer's paintings often depicted marine landscapes. Later, when Winslow Homer spent the years between 1881 and 1882 in the village of Cullercoats, Tyne and Wear, his paintings depicting shores and coastal landscapes changed. Many of the paintings from the English coast have as subjects working men and women from the area.

Shores and beaches

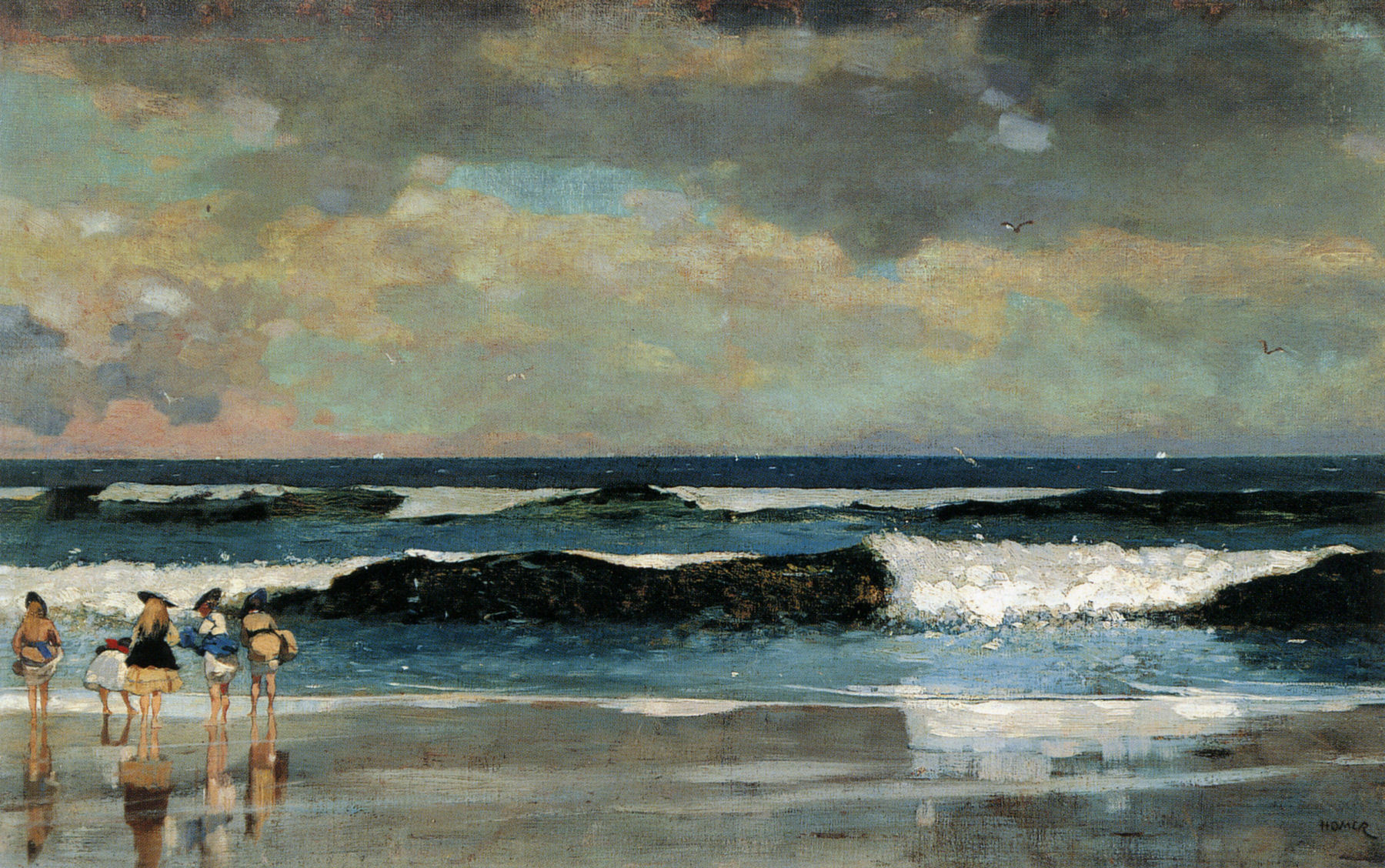
On the Beach, 1869

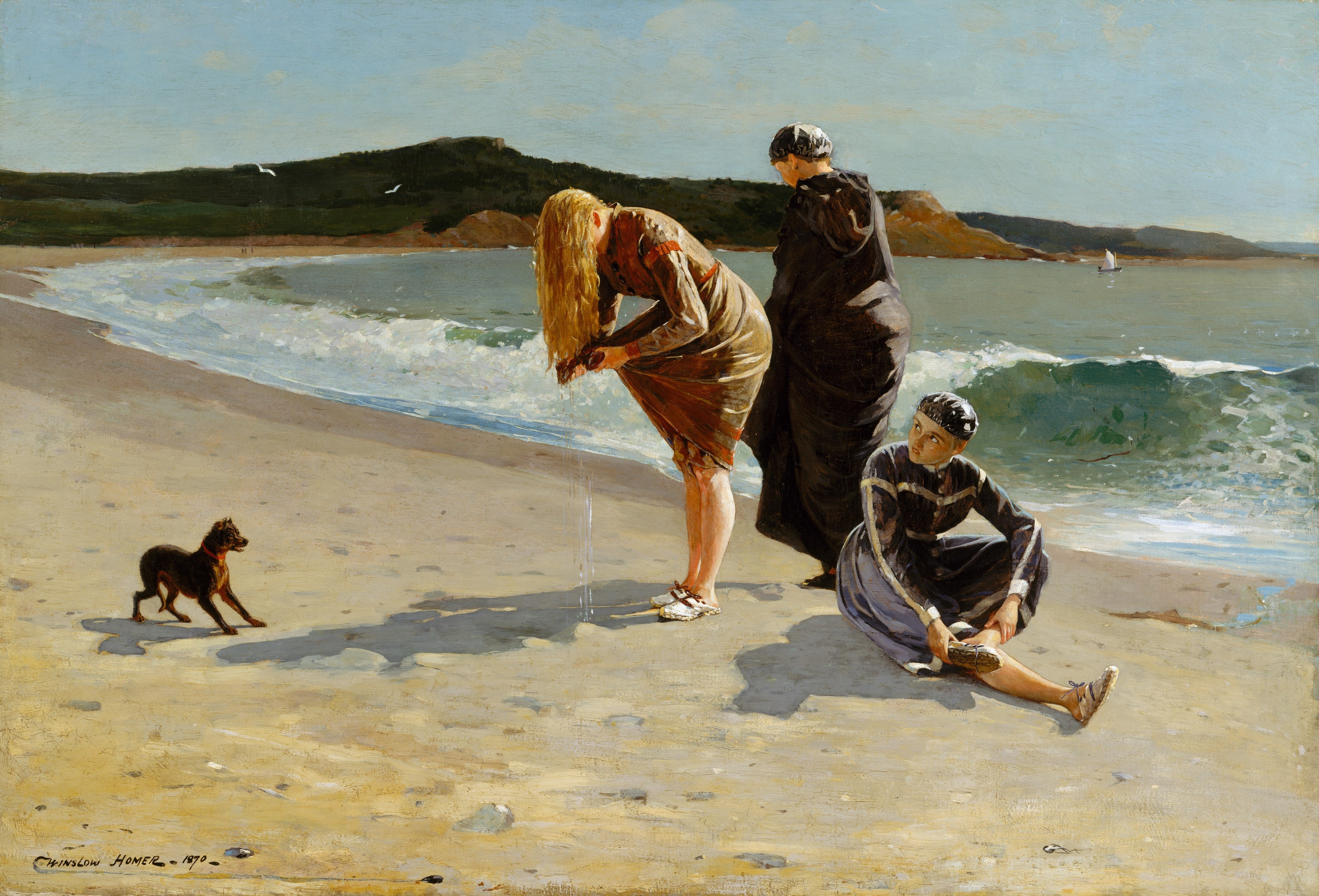
Eagle Head, Manchester, Massachusetts, 1870

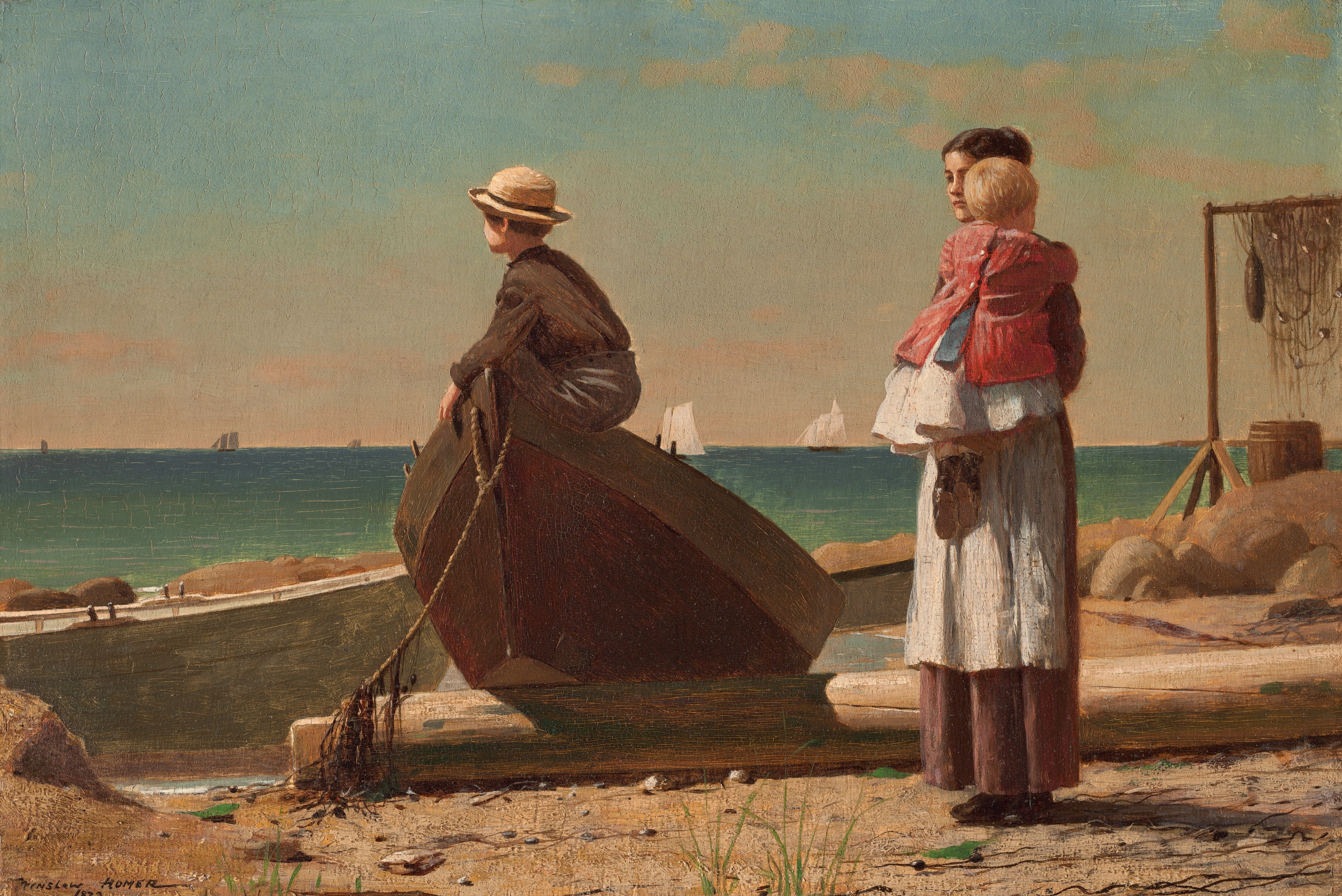
Dad's Coming!, 1873

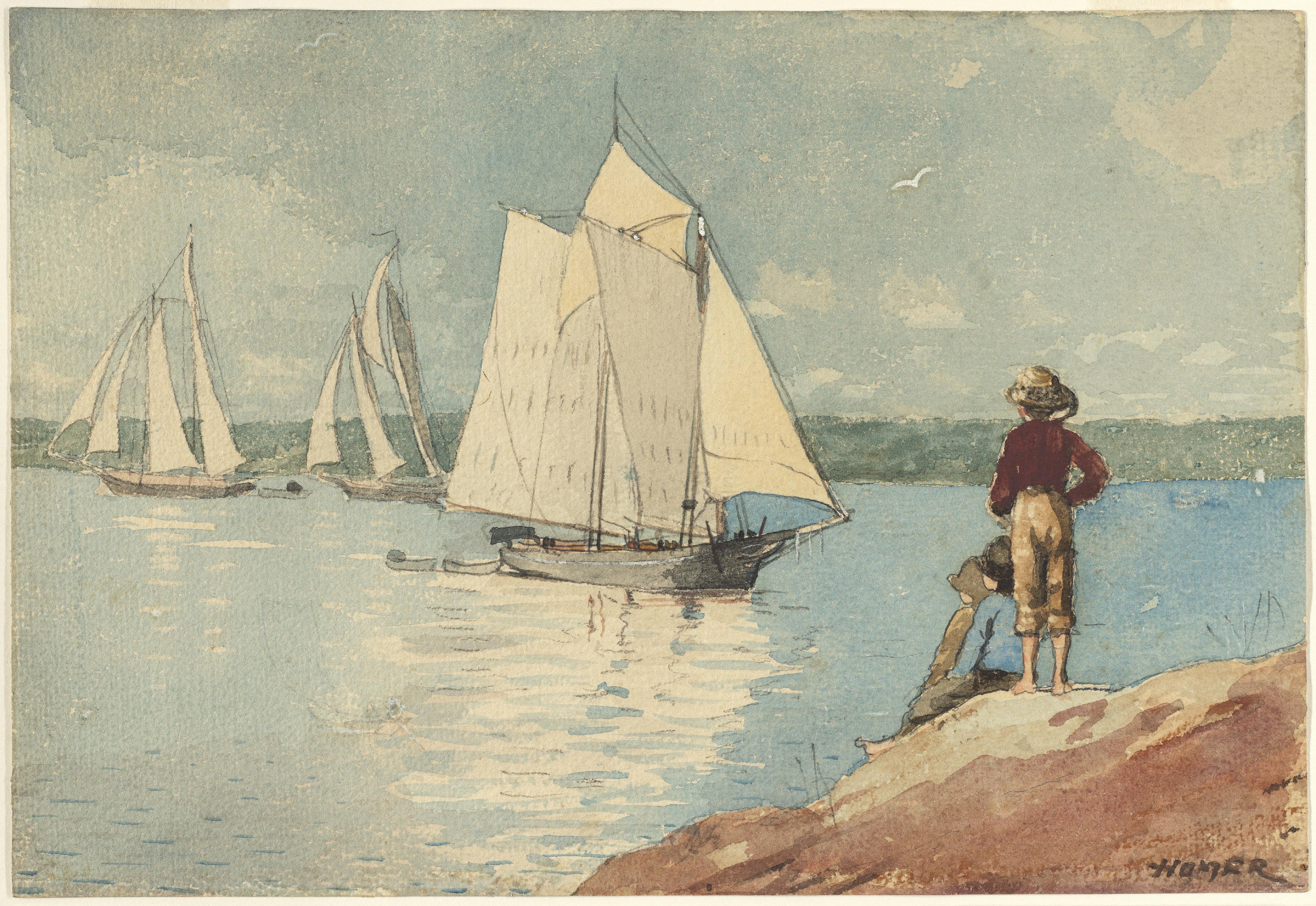
Clear Sailing, 1880

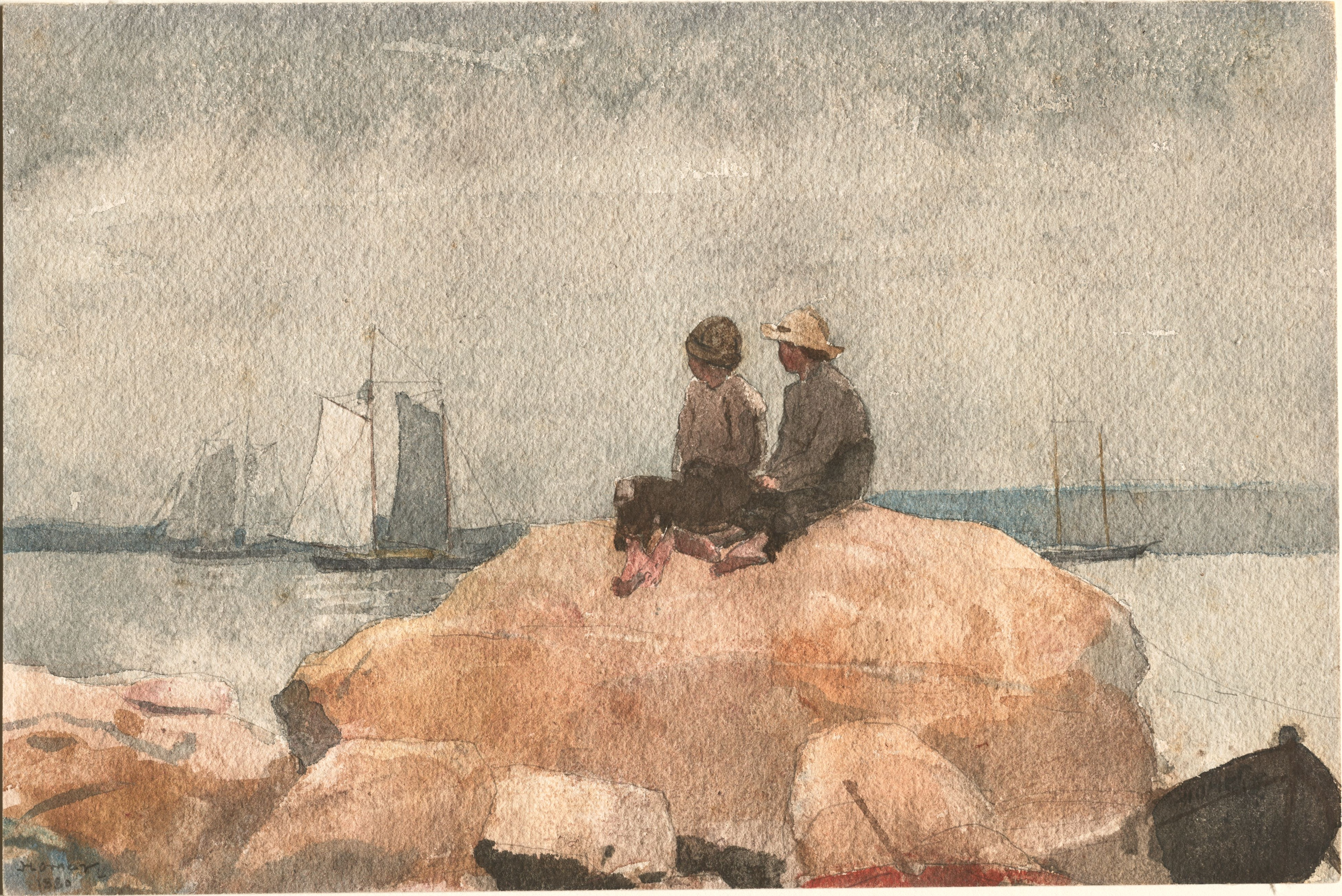
Two boys watching schooners, 1880

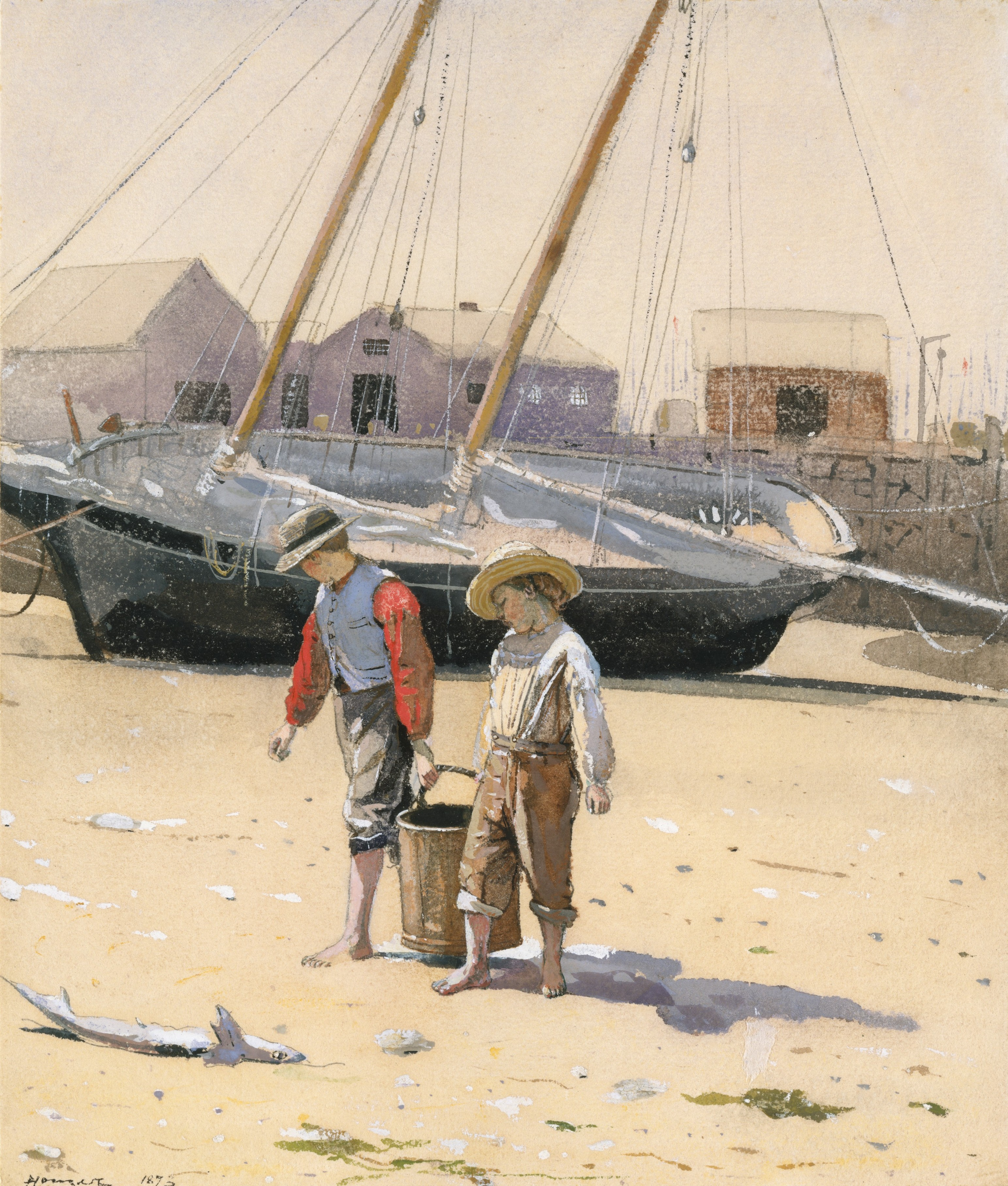
A Basket of Clams, 1873

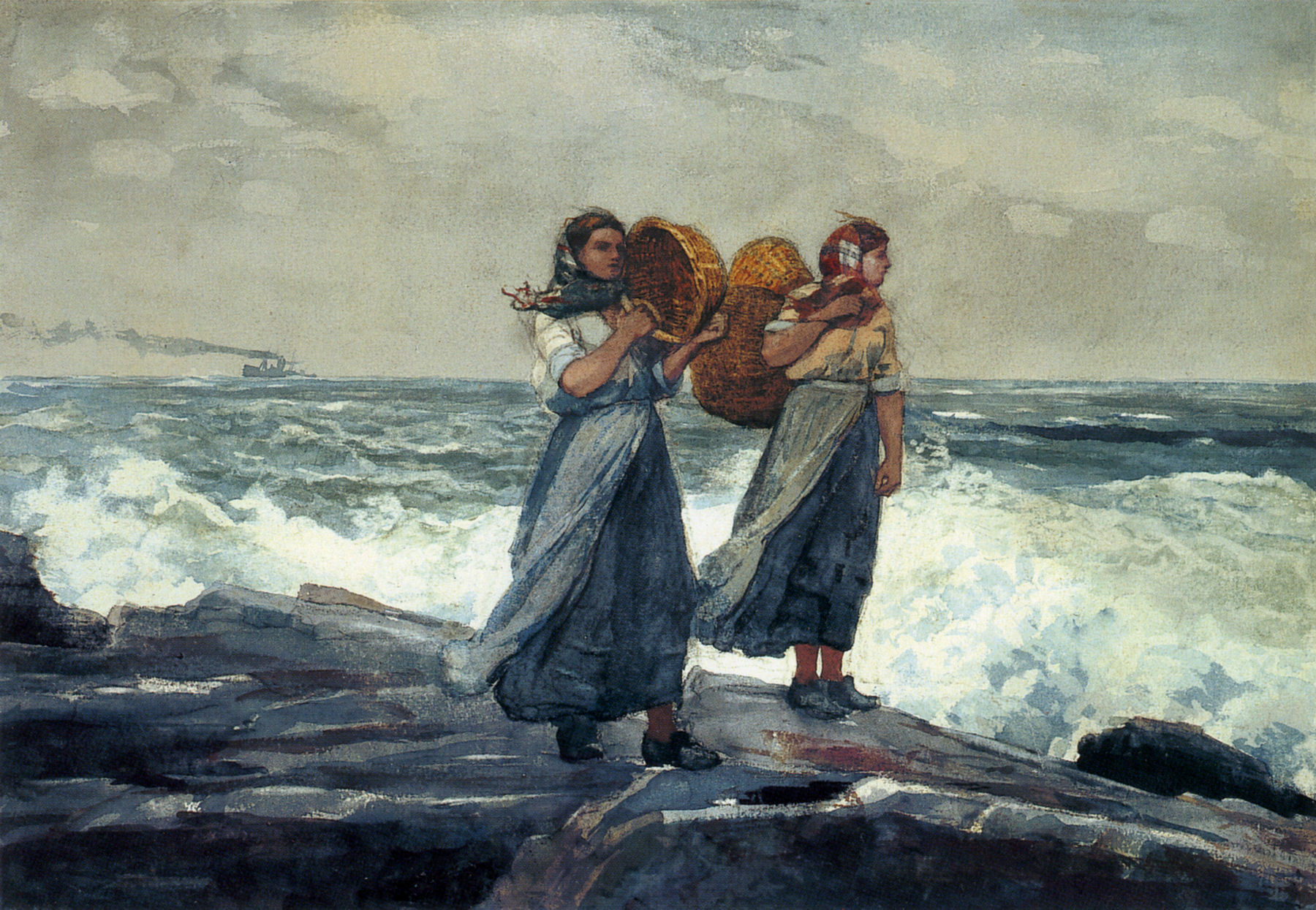
A Fresh Breeze, c. 1881

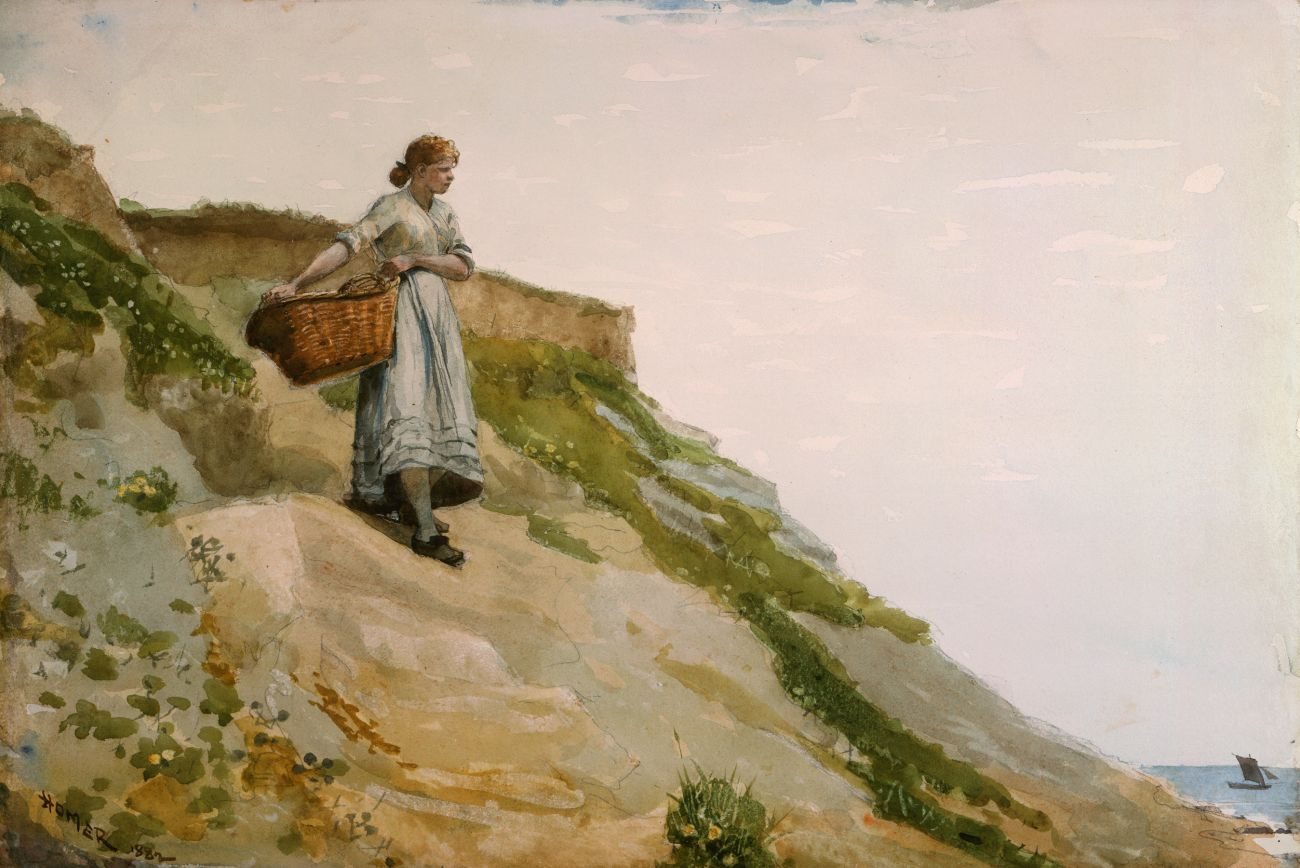
Girl Carrying a Basket, 1882

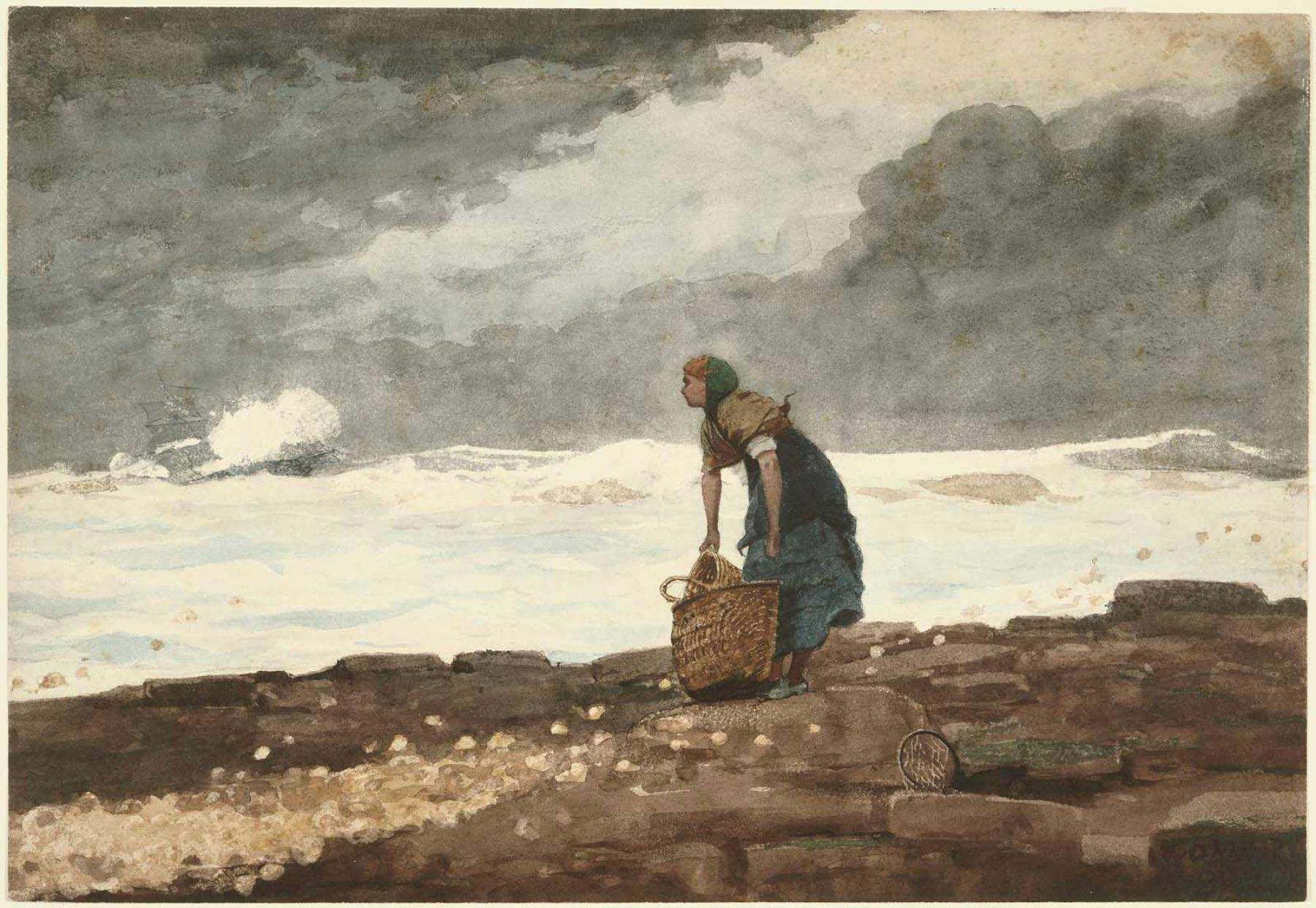
Girl with Red Stockings, 1882

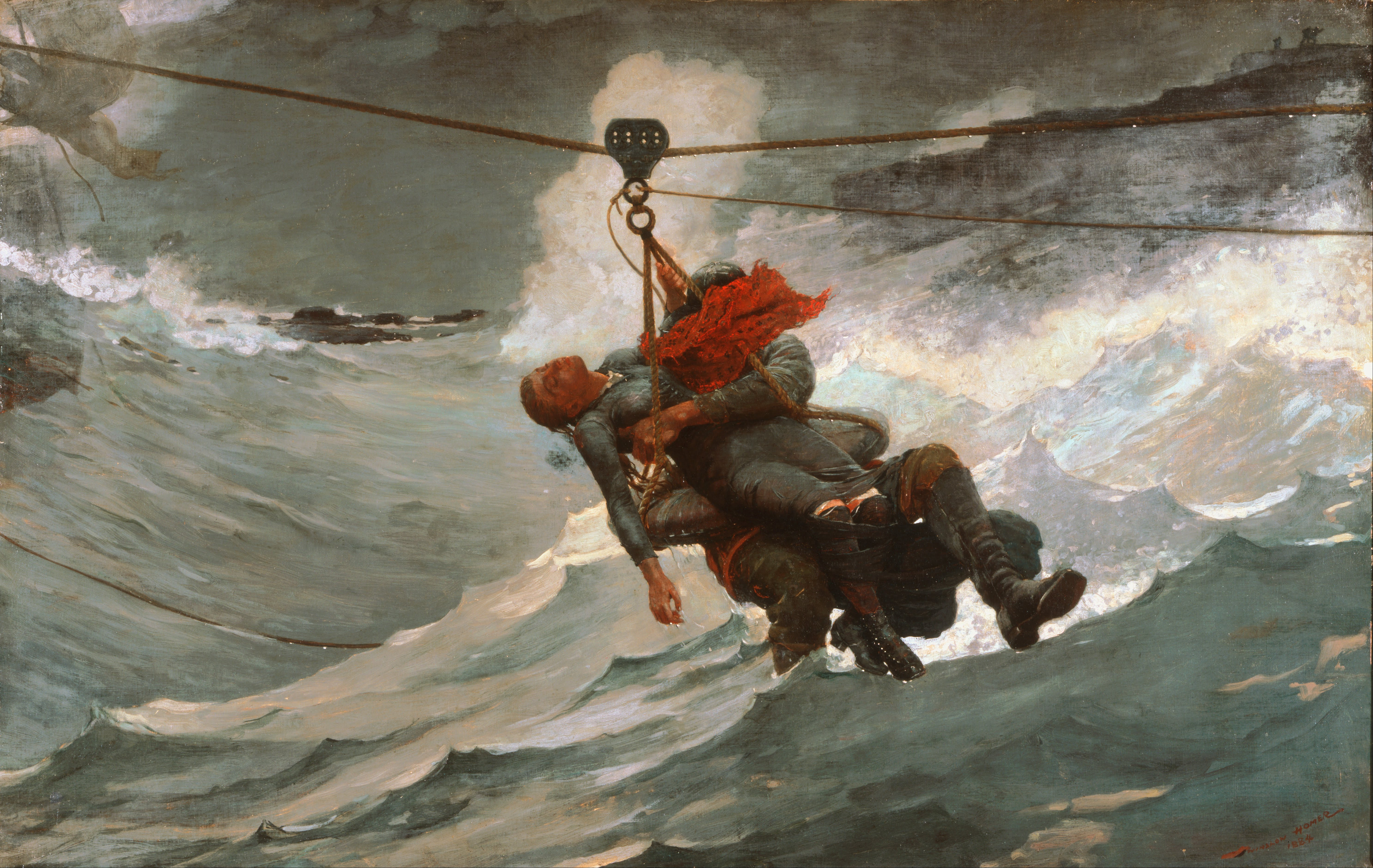
The Life Line, 1884

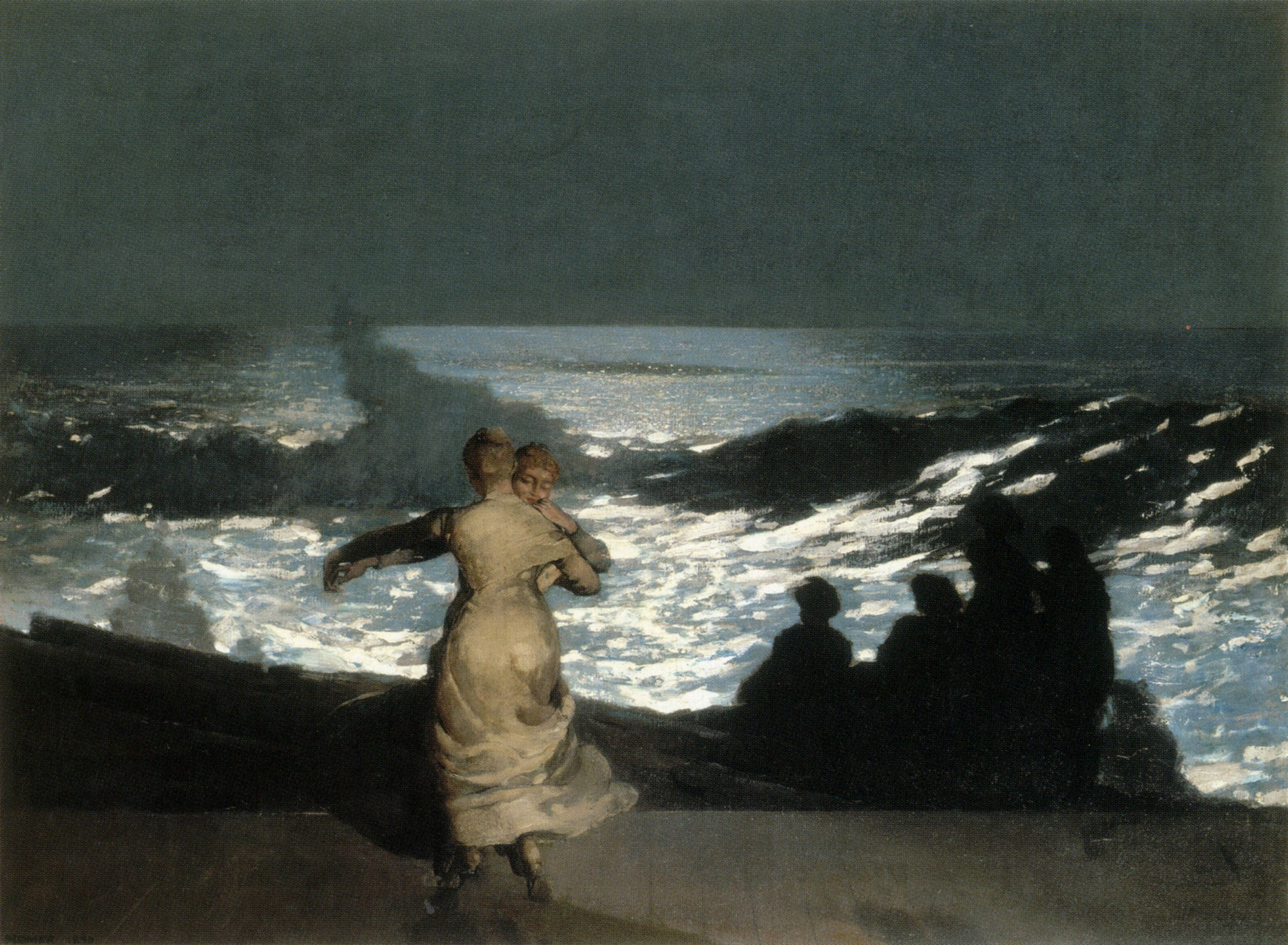
Summer Night, 1890

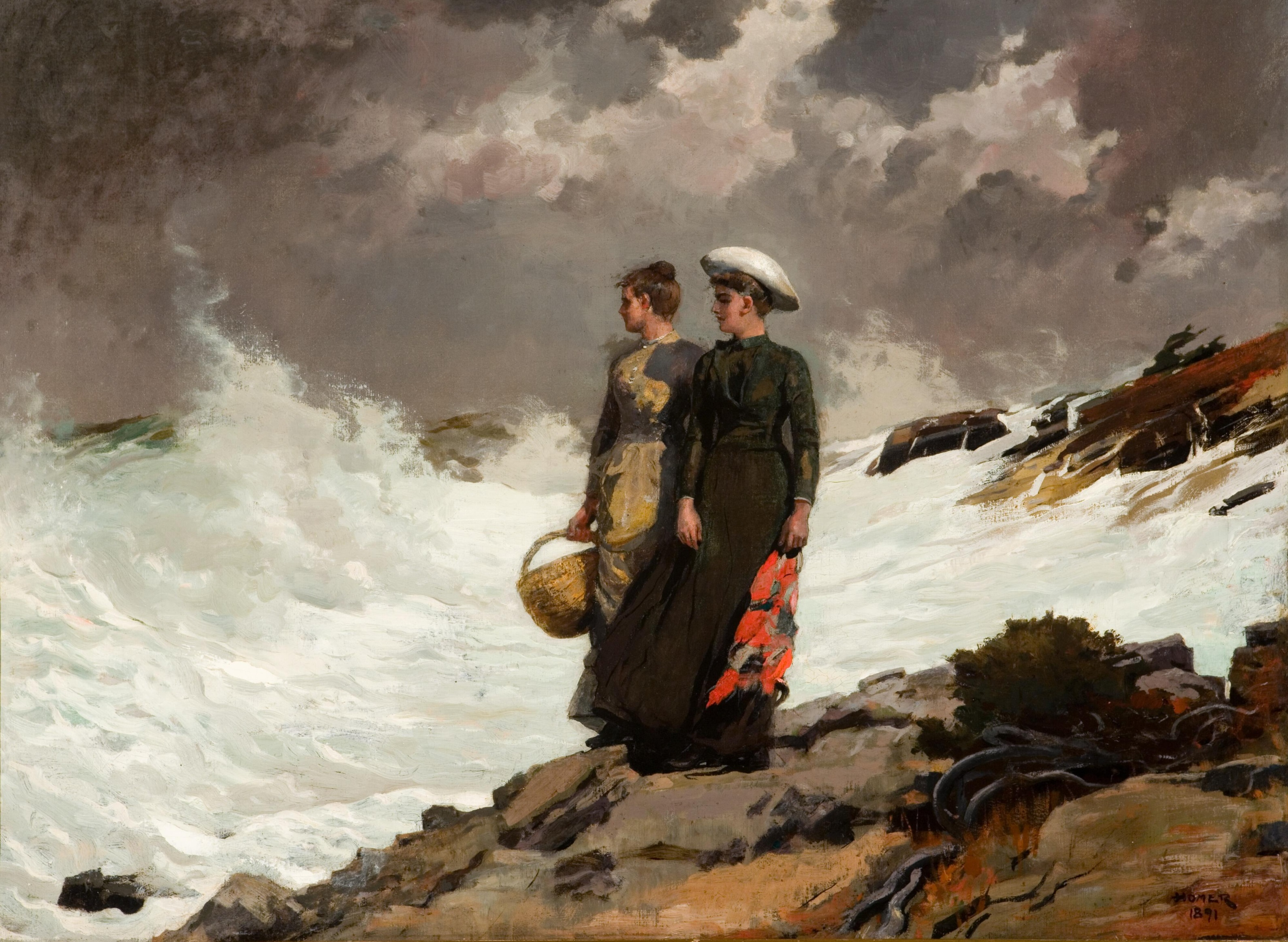
Watching the Breakers, 1891

Mountain landscapes

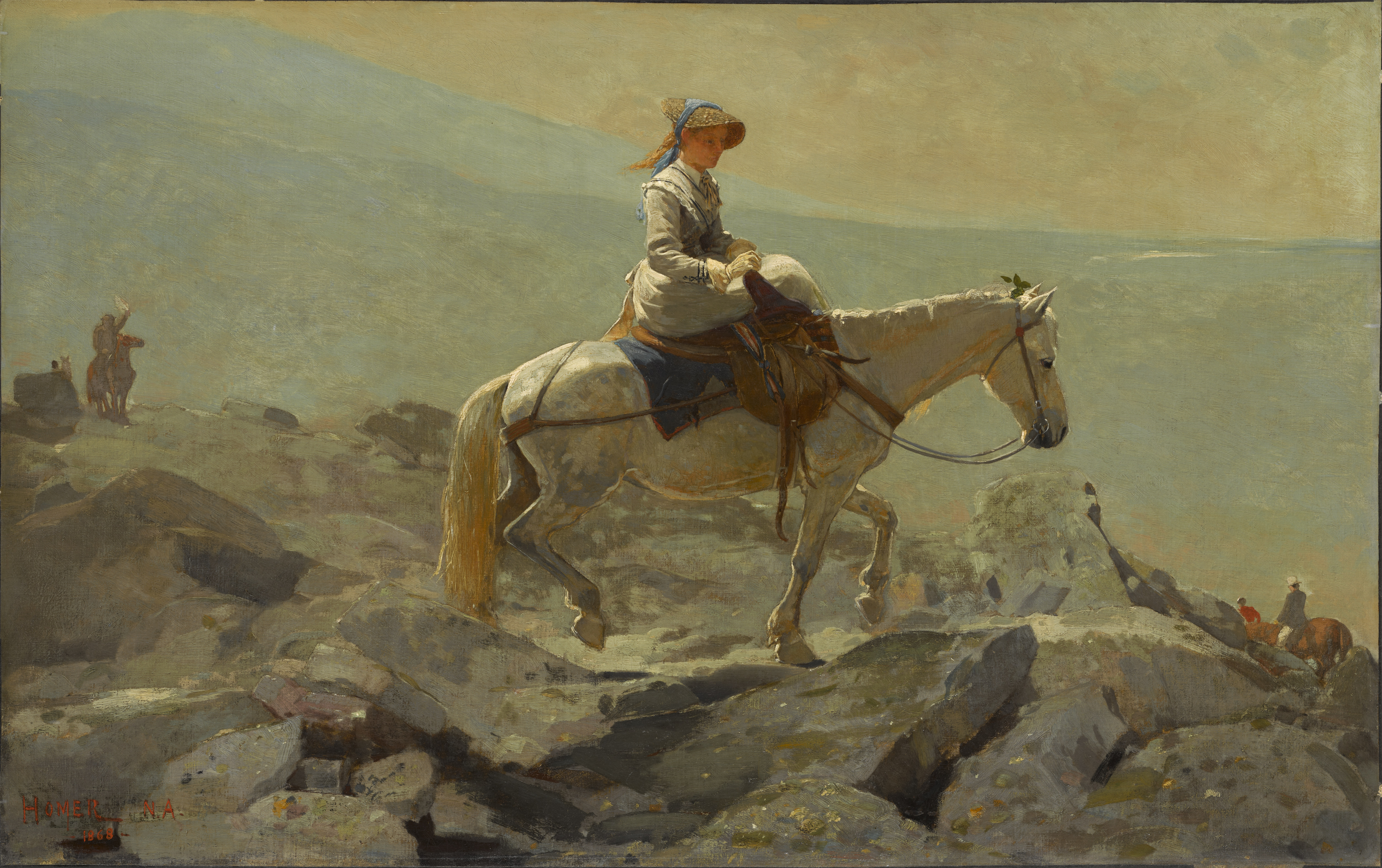
The Bridle Path, 1868, oil painting (Clark Art Institute)

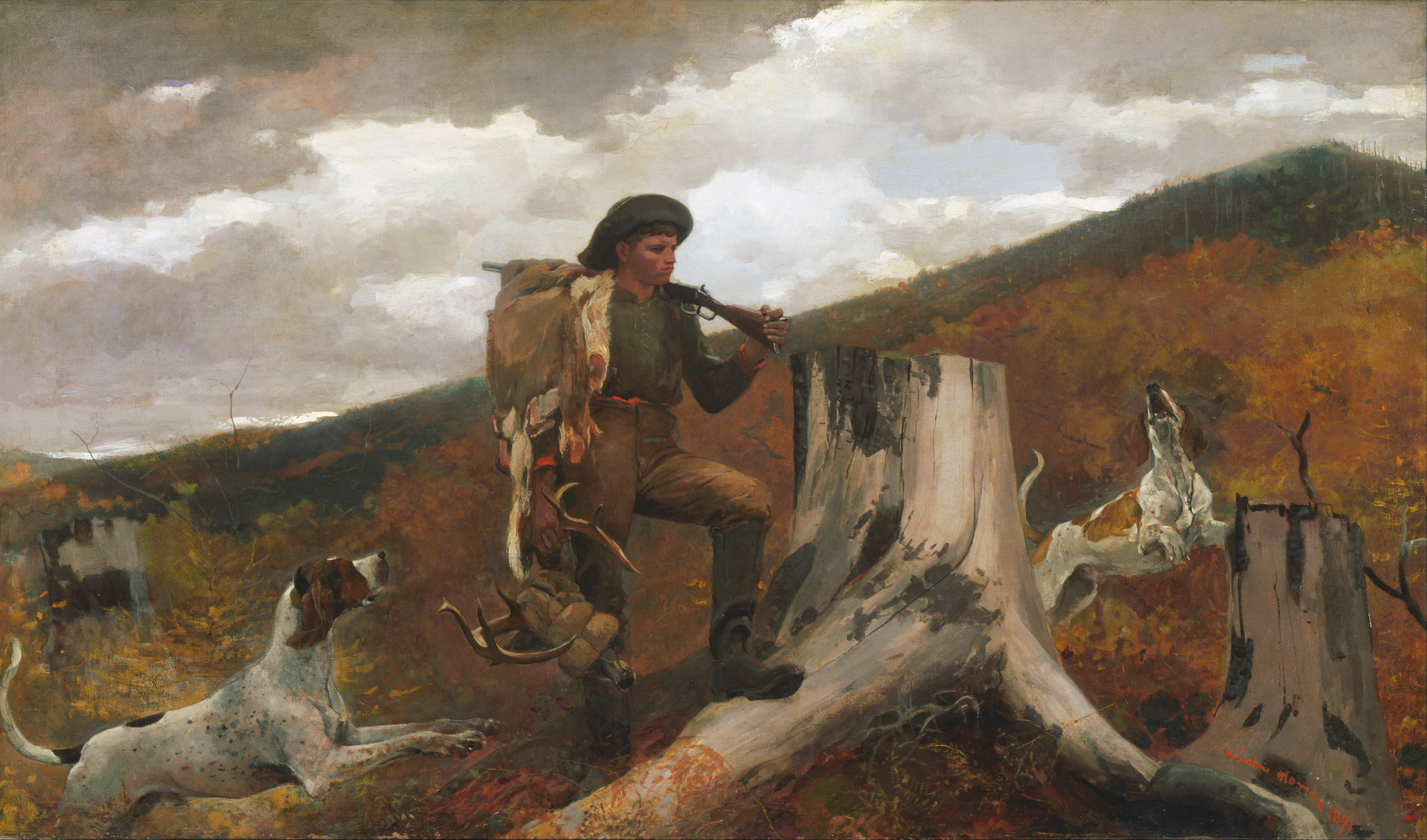
A Huntsman and Dogs, 1891

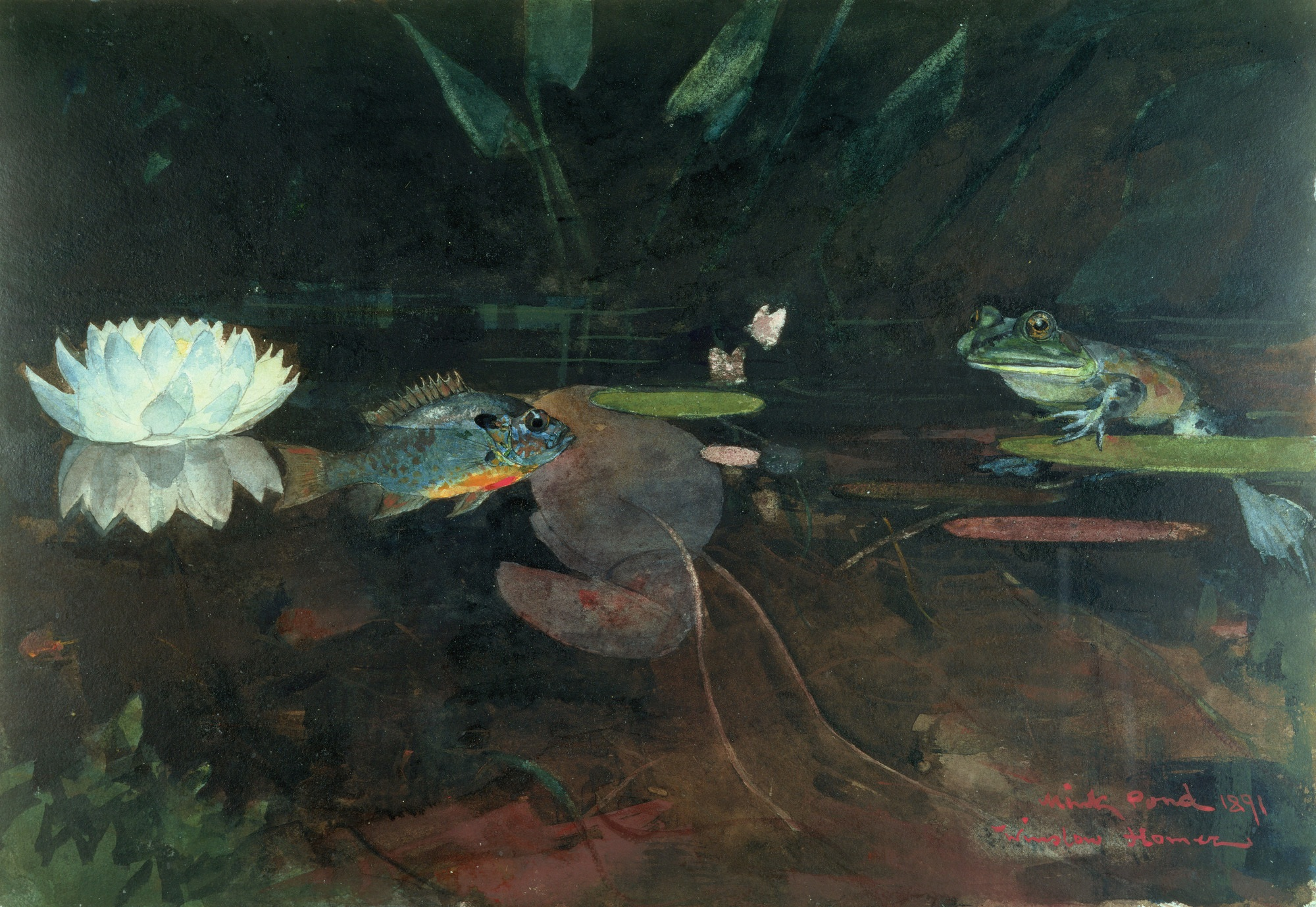
Mink Pond, 1891

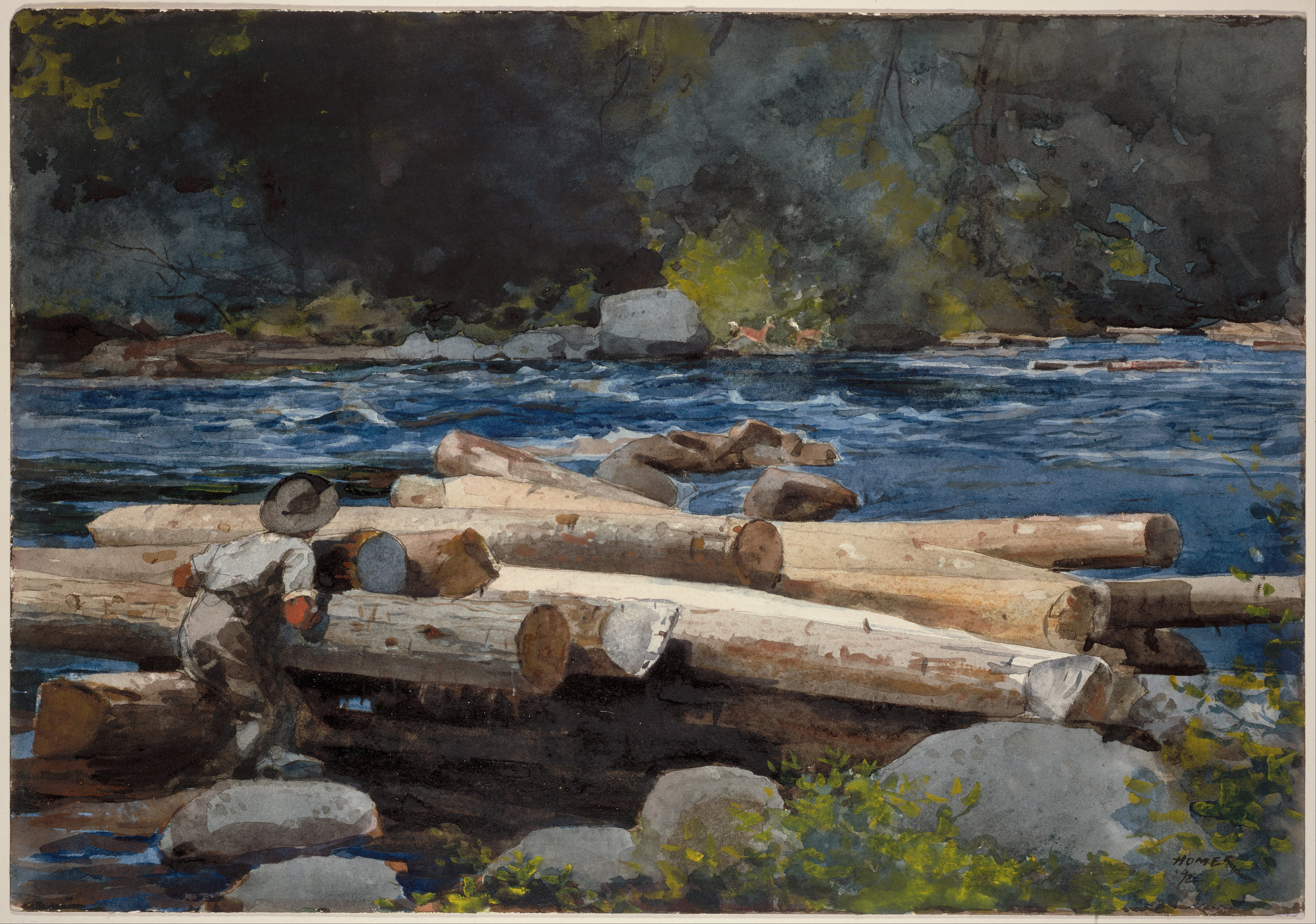
The Hudson River, 1892

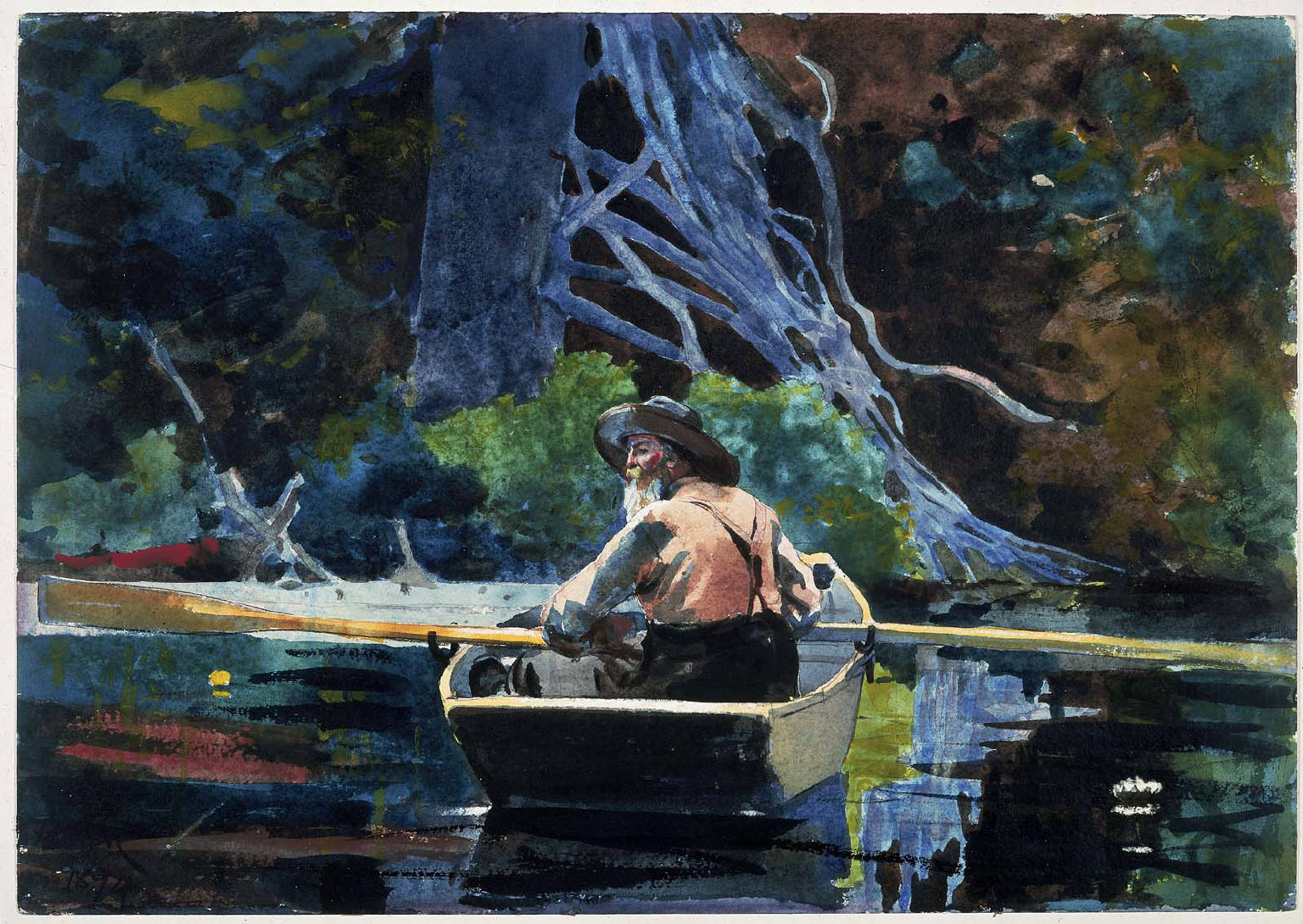
The Adirondack Guide, 1894
Croquet

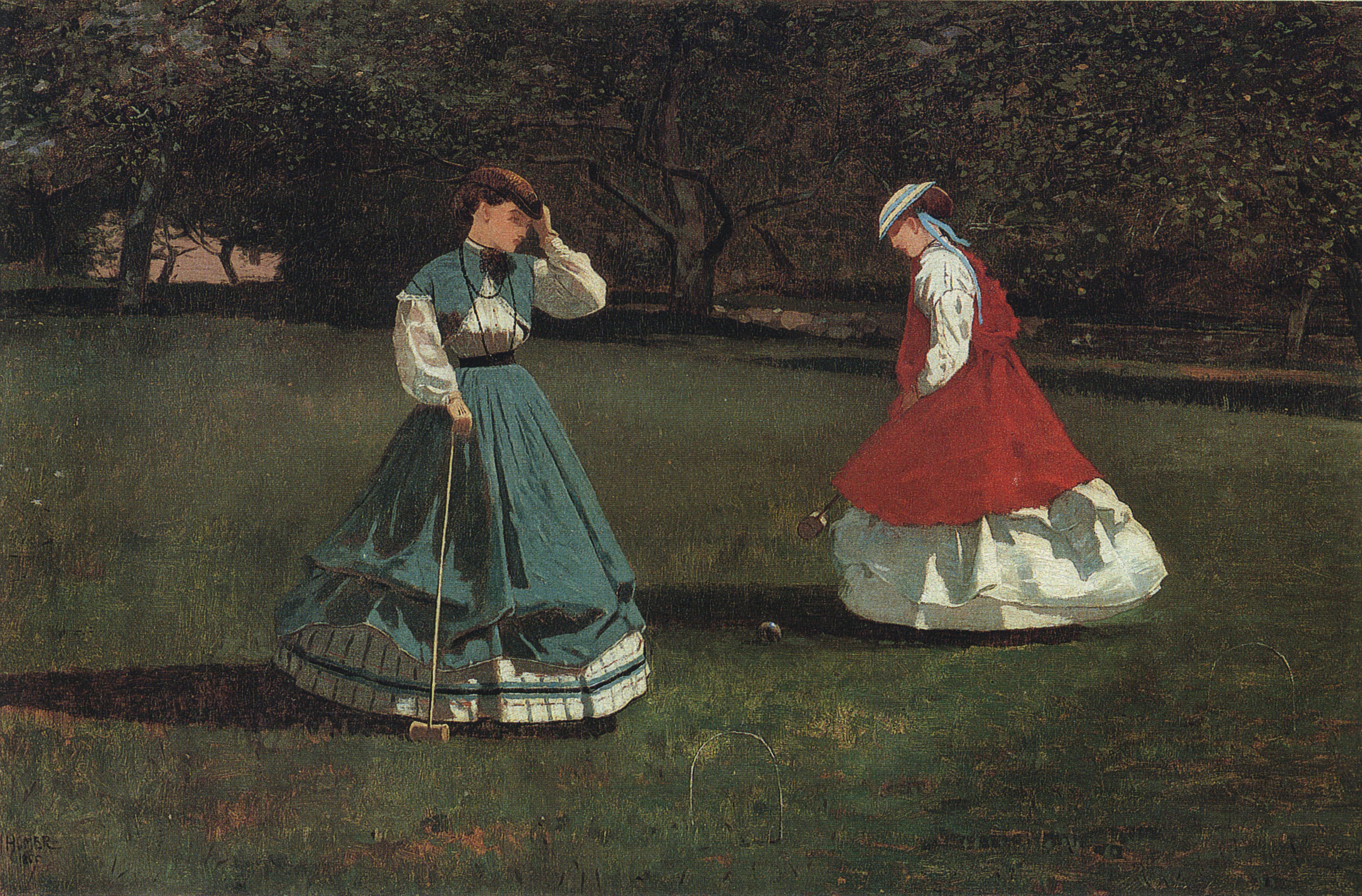
A Game of Croquet, 1866

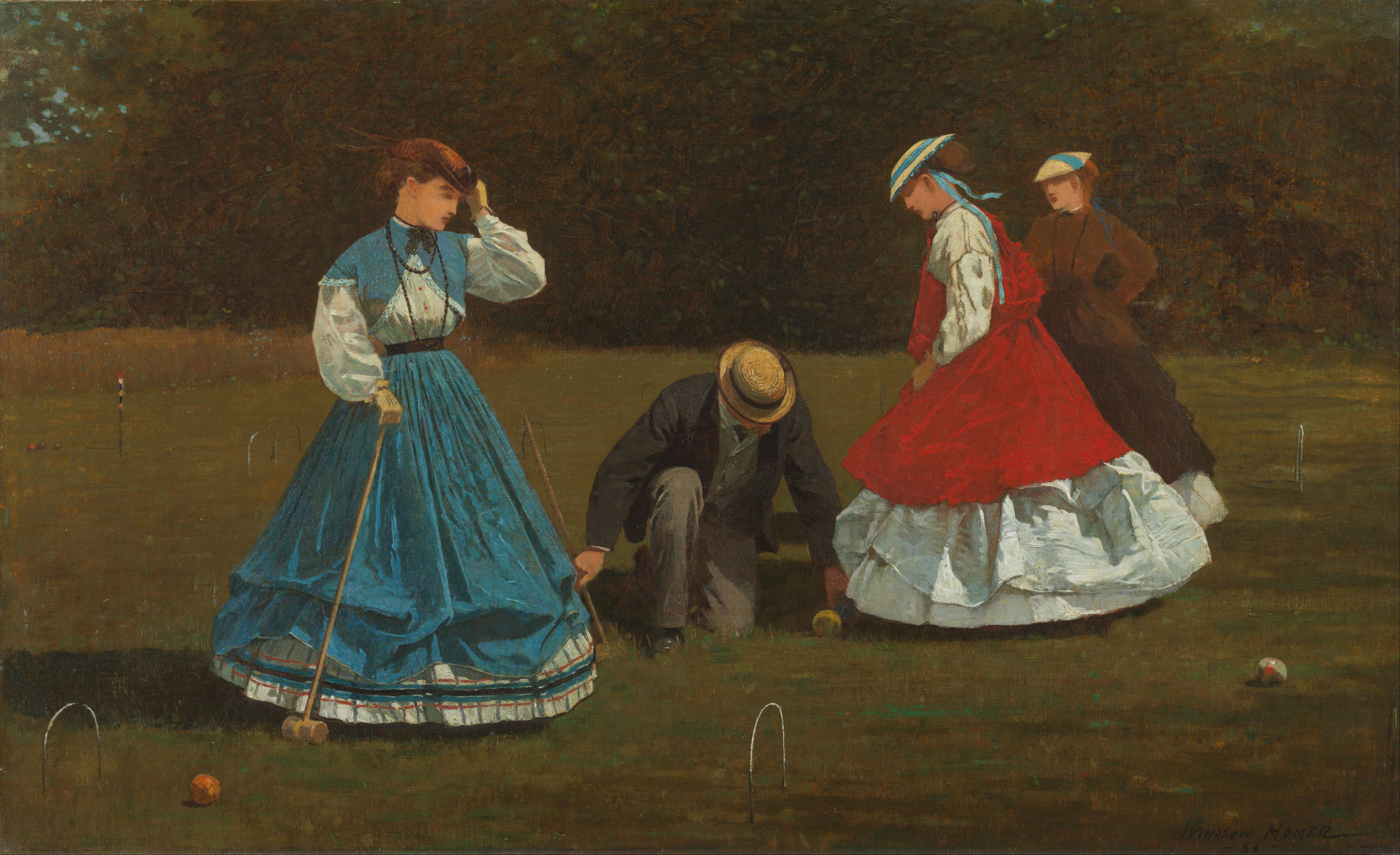
Croquet Scene, 1866

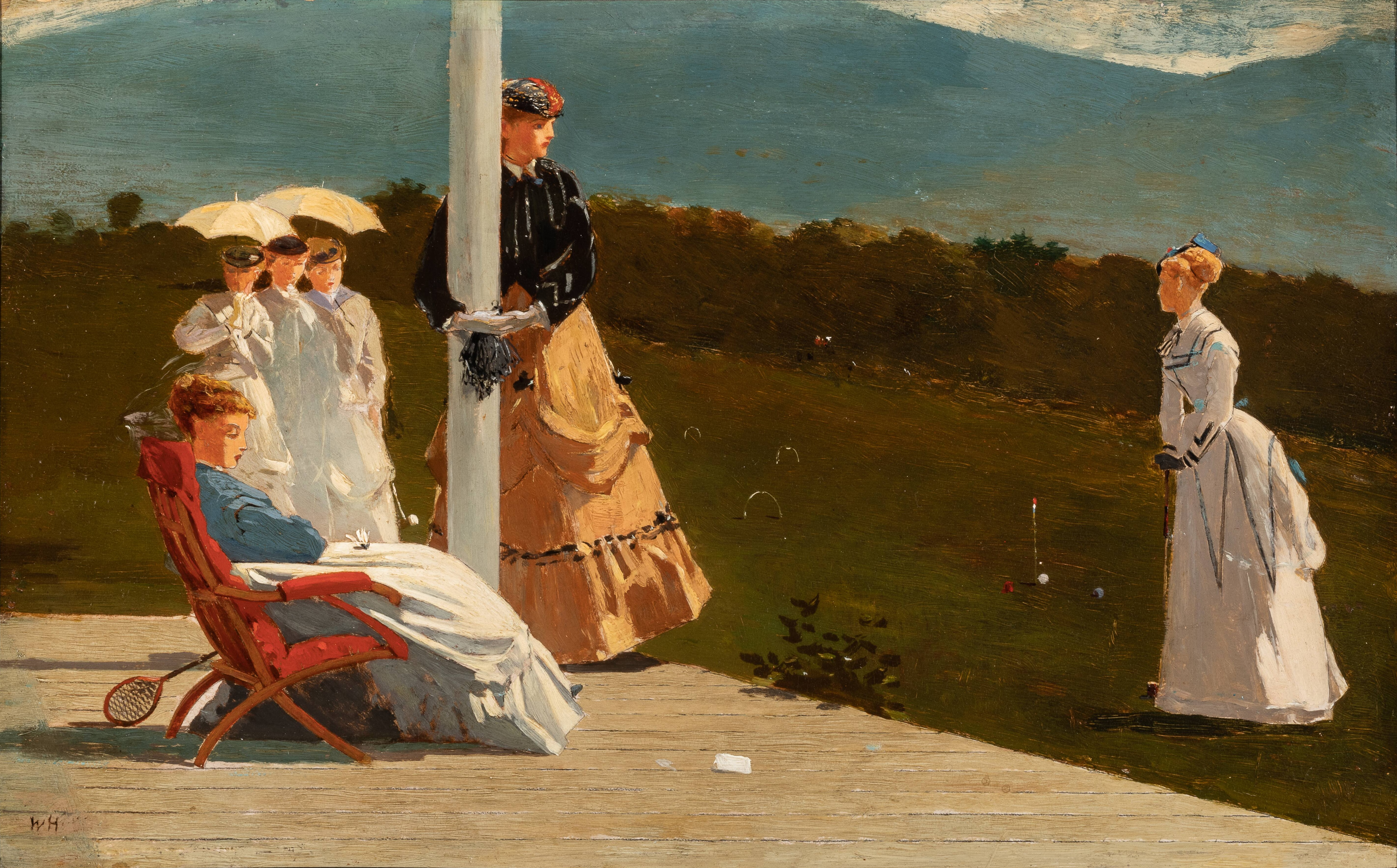
The Croquet Match, c. 1869

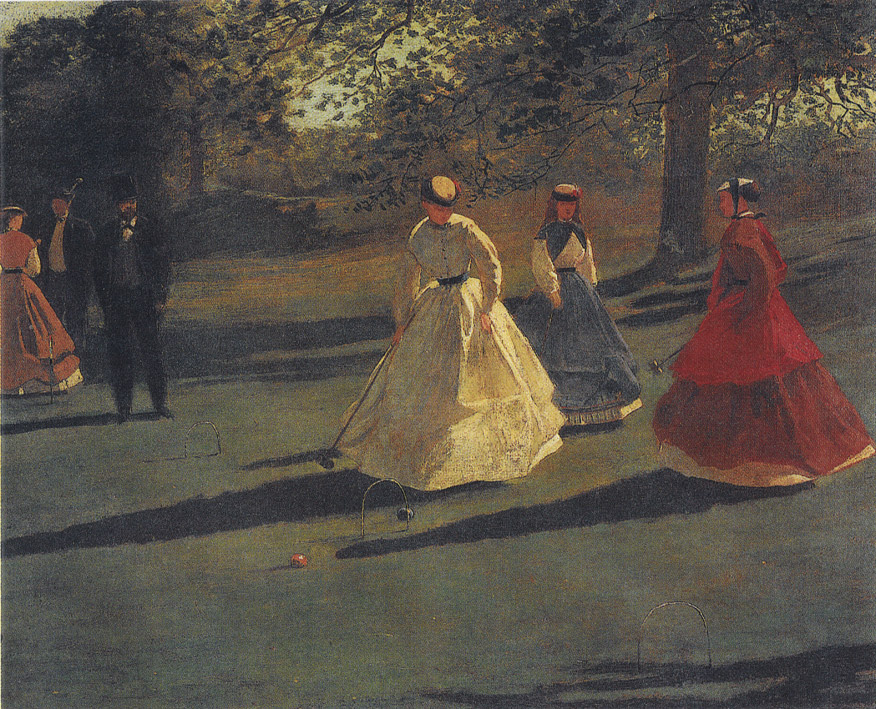
Croquet Players, 1865

== Exhibitions ==
- Winslow Homer, National Gallery of Art, November 23, 1958 – January 4, 1959, and Metropolitan Museum of Art, New York, January 29 – March 8, 1959; catalog: Winslow Homer: A Retrospective Exhibition, by Albert Ten Eyck Gardner.
- Paintings and Drawings by Winslow Homer, 1836–1910, Fogg Art Museum, June 1, 1936 – June 30, 1986
- Winslow Homer Watercolors, National Gallery of Art, March 2 – May 11, 1986; Amon Carter Museum, Fort Worth, June 6 – July 27, 1986, and Yale University Art Gallery, New Haven, Connecticut, September 11 – November 2, 1986; catalog: Winslow Homer Watercolors, by Helen A. Cooper
- Winslow Homer: Works on Paper, The Clark Art Institute, July 31 – October 30, 1999
- Winslow Homer: The Illustrator, Saint Mary's College of California, January 17 – March 7, 2004
- Winslow Homer in the National Gallery of Art, July 3, 2005 – February 26, 2006
- Winslow Homer: Poet of the Sea co-organized by the Musée d'Art Américain Giverny (exhibited June 18 – September 24, 2006), Terra Foundation for American Art and the Dulwich Picture Gallery, London (exhibited February 22 – May 21, 2006)
- Winslow Homer: American Scenes, Museum of Fine Arts, Boston, June 20, 2008 – January 11, 2009
- Shipwreck! Winslow Homer and The Life Line, Philadelphia Museum of Art, September 22, 2012 – January 1, 2013
- Winslow Homer: Making Art, Making History, Clark Art Institute, June 9 – September 8, 2013
- Homer's America: Selections from the Permanent Collection, The Hyde Collection, June 21 – September 16, 2015
- American Watercolor in the Age of Homer and Sargent, Philadelphia Museum of Art, March 1 – May 14, 2017
- Coming Away: Winslow Homer & England, Worcester Art Museum, November 11, 2017 – February 4, 2018 and Milwaukee Art Museum, March 1 – May 20, 2018
- Winslow Homer: Photography and the Art of Painting, Bowdoin College Museum of Art, June 23 – October 28, 2018, Brandywine Museum of Art, November 16, 2018 – February 17, 2019
- Homer at the Beach: A Marine Painter's Journey, 1869–1880, Cape Ann Museum, Gloucester, Massachusetts, August 3 – December 1, 2019
- Winslow Homer: Eyewitness, University Research Gallery, Harvard Art Museums, August 31, 2019 – January 5, 2020
- America at Play: Winslow Homer, Newport Art Museum, October 5 – December 1, 2019
- Scenes In Circulation: Winslow Homer's America, Fitchburg Art Museum, January 11 – August 30, 2020
- In a Different Light: Winslow Homer & Frederic Remington, Sid Richardson Museum, Fort Worth, March 14, 2020 – March 12, 2022
- Winslow Homer: Illustrator, The Arkell Museum, July 9 – December 30, 2020
- Winslow Homer: Crosscurrents, Metropolitan Museum of Art, April 11 – July 31, 2022
- Winslow Homer: Force of Nature, National Gallery, London, September 10, 2022 – January 8, 2023
- Of Light and Air: Winslow Homer in Watercolor, Museum of Fine Arts, Boston, November 2, 2025 – January 19, 2026
- Seeing the News in Harper's Weekly, 1860–80, Georgia Museum of Art, May 23 – July 12, 2026
- Winslow Homer: Painter, Etcher, Portland Museum of Art, July 3 – October 18, 2026

== Collections ==
Winslow Homer's works are in the following collections:

- Art Institute of Chicago
- Brooklyn Museum
- Carnegie Museum of Art
- Clark Art Institute
- Cleveland Museum of Art
- Colby College Museum of Art
- Cooper Hewitt, Smithsonian Design Museum
- Crystal Bridges Museum of American Art
- Farnsworth Art Museum
- Hyde Collection
- Los Angeles County Museum of Art
- Metropolitan Museum of Art
- Milwaukee Museum of Art
- Museo Nacional Thyssen-Bornemisza
- Museum of Fine Arts, Boston
- Museum of Fine Arts, Houston
- National Gallery of Art
- Nelson-Atkins Museum of Art
- Pennsylvania Academy of the Fine Arts
- Philadelphia Museum of Art
- Portland Museum of Art
- Princeton University Art Museum
- Saint Louis Art Museum
- Smithsonian American Art Museum
- Yale University Art Gallery

== See also ==
- List of paintings by Winslow Homer – Paintings by the American artist Winslow Homer
