= Lost on the Grand Banks =

Painting by Winslow Homer

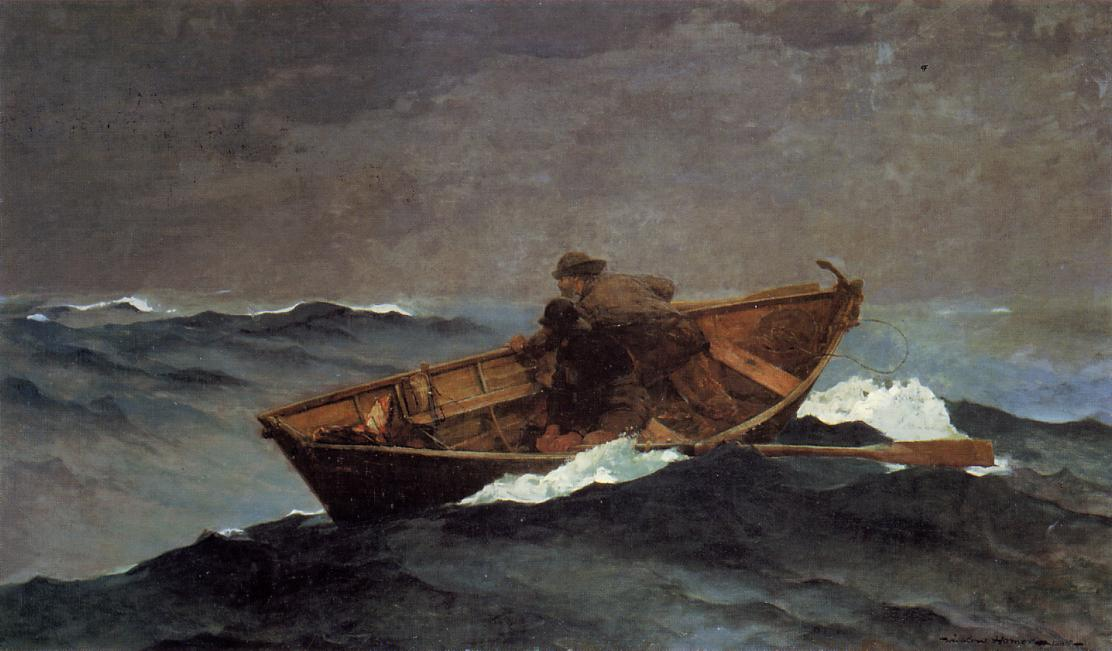
- Artist: Winslow Homer
- Year: 1885
- Medium: Oil on canvas
- Dimensions: 81 cm × 130 cm (32 in × 50 in)
- Location: Private collection
- Owner: Bill Gates

Lost on the Grand Banks (1885) is one of several paintings on marine subjects by the American painter Winslow Homer (1836–1910). Together with The Herring Net and The Fog Warning, painted in the same year, it depicts the hard lives of North Atlantic fishermen in Prouts Neck, Maine. The painting was bought in 1998 by Bill Gates, then-chairman of Microsoft, who reportedly paid $30 million for the seascape, at the time a record price for an American painting.

== See also ==
- List of paintings by Winslow Homer
