= Boys in a Dory =

Painting by Winslow Homer

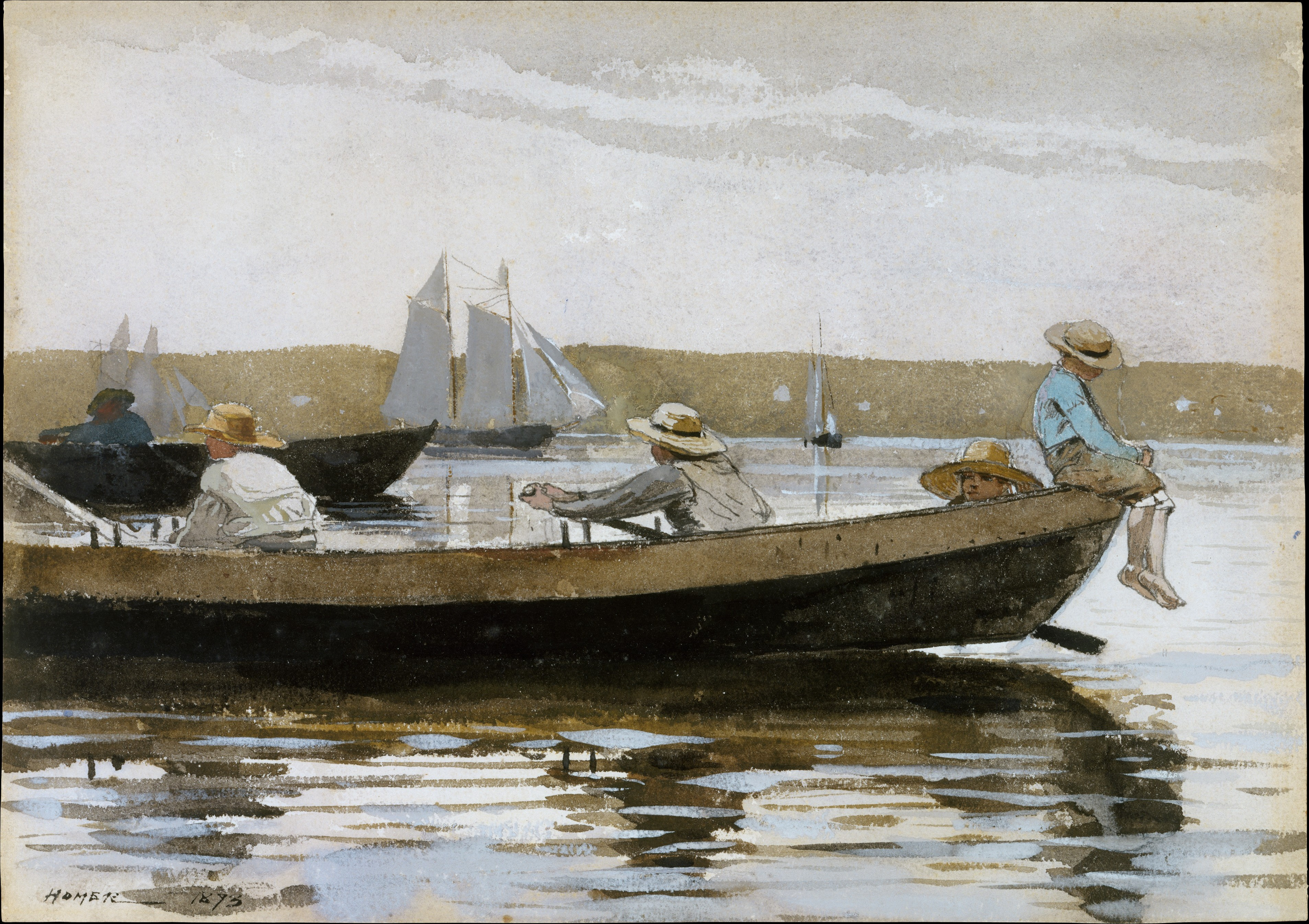
- Artist: Winslow Homer
- Year: 1873
- Medium: Watercolor and gouache on graphite underdrawing and white wove paper
- Dimensions: 24.8 cm × 35.2 cm (9.8 in × 13.9 in)
- Location: Metropolitan Museum of Art; New York City
- Accession: 2001.608.1

Boys in a Dory is a mid 19th-century watercolor painting by American artist Winslow Homer. Done in watercolor and gouache on wove paper, the painting depicts a group of boys boating in a dory. Winslow's work is in the collection of the Metropolitan Museum of Art.

== Description ==
Boys in a Dory is one of Homer's first watercolors. According to the Met's description of the painting, the artist's initial style of watercolors resulted in Boys being simple and direct.

The painting was rendered by Homer while he was in Gloucester, Massachusetts.

== See also ==
- List of paintings by Winslow Homer
