= A Basket of Clams =

Painting by Winslow Homer

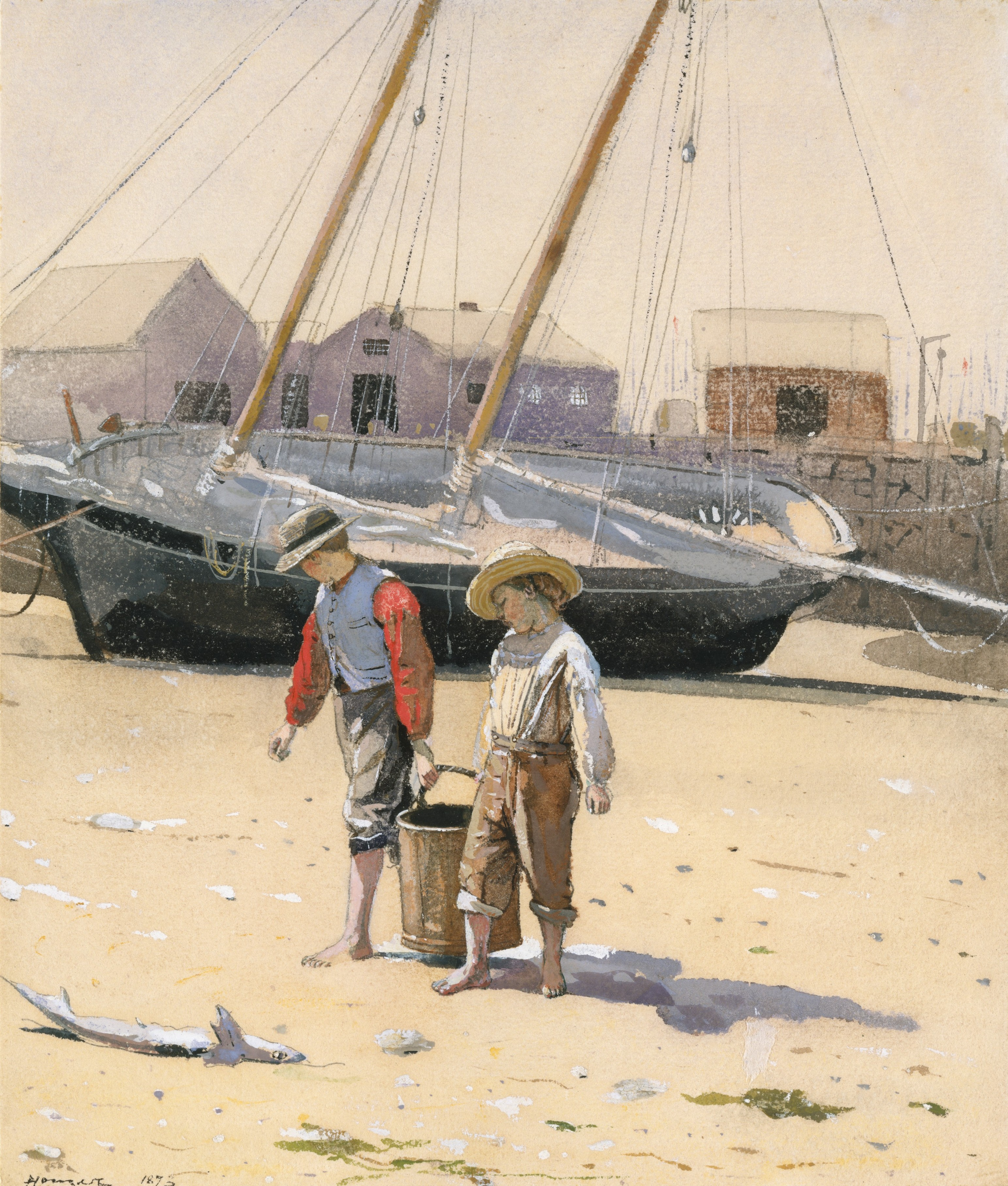
- Artist: Winslow Homer
- Year: 1873
- Medium: Watercolor on wove paper
- Dimensions: 29.2 cm × 24.8 cm (11.5 in × 9.8 in)
- Location: Metropolitan Museum of Art; New York
- Accession: 1995.378

A Basket of Clams is a mid-19th century watercolor by American artist Winslow Homer in the collection of the Metropolitan Museum of Art in New York City. It is the earliest watercolor by Homer in the Metropolitan Museum and was the gift of Arthur G. Altschul in 1995.

== Description ==
The work, which was one of several Homer painted in the town of Gloucester, Massachusetts, depicts two children carrying a basket of clams as they walk along the beach. The smaller boy looks at the dead shark in front of them, while the taller boy looks back at the ship. The dead shark and the ship are thought to subtly suggest a darker atmosphere.

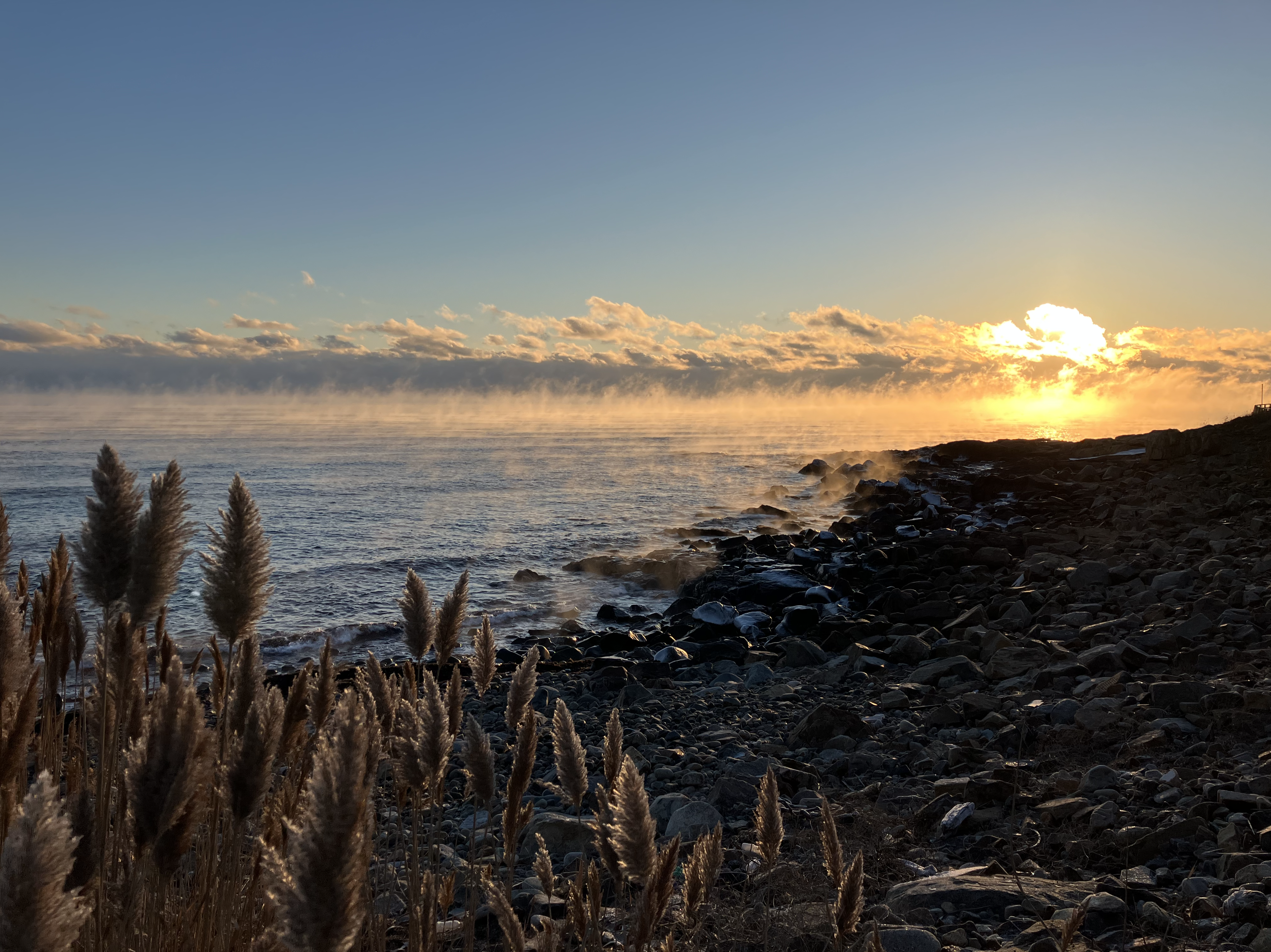
A beach in Gloucester, Massachusetts

A Basket of Clams is typical of the vigorous layout and light of Homer's early watercolors, reminiscent of his earlier career as an illustrator.

== See also ==
- List of paintings by Winslow Homer
