= Hark! The Lark =

1882 painting by Winslow Homer

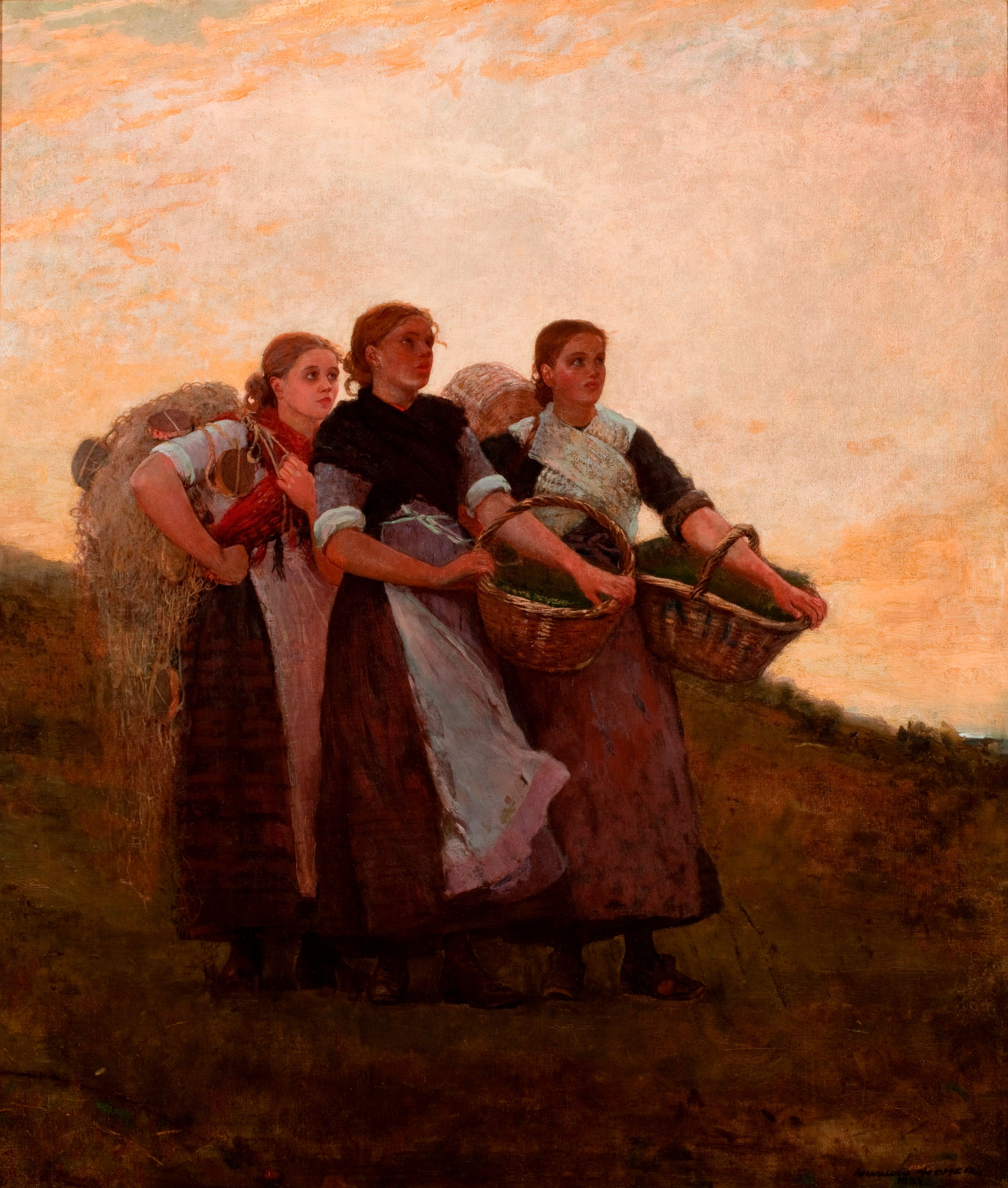
- Artist: Winslow Homer
- Year: 1882
- Medium: Oil on canvas
- Dimensions: 92.4 cm × 79.7 cm (36 3/8 in × 31 3/8 in)
- Location: Milwaukee Art Museum, Milwaukee

Hark! The Lark is an 1882 oil painting by American artist Winslow Homer, part of the collection of the Milwaukee Art Museum. Painted during Homer’s stay in the English fishing village of Cullercoats, the work depicts three young women carrying baskets in a coastal landscape.

Homer selected Hark! The Lark for exhibition at the Royal Academy's Summer Exhibition of 1882 in London and later described it as "the most important picture [he] ever painted, and the very best one."

== Background and description ==
Homer traveled to England in 1881 and settled for approximately eighteen months in Cullercoats, a fishing community on the North Sea coast near Newcastle upon Tyne. His residence there marked an important transition in his career. Before traveling abroad, Homer had established himself in the United States as an illustrator and painter of subjects including the American Civil War, rural life, leisure, and childhood. In Cullercoats, he increasingly concentrated on the lives of fishing communities and on the physical demands of coastal life.

The painting shows three women in a hilly landscape. They wear long dresses and aprons and carry large baskets associated with the labor of a fishing village. The figures turn or raise their heads as if responding to the distant sound of a lark.

== Interpretation ==
The women's monumentality places the painting within Homer's broader treatment of laboring figures and growing interest in seascapes. Scholars have compared the composition to The Cotton Pickers (1876), suggesting continuity in his representation of working women as substantial and strong presences rather than picturesque types, an aspect that attracted him during his English stay.

The painting's title, reportedly drawn from William Shakespeare's Cymbeline, also gives the scene a literary and specifically British resonance.

== Posterity ==
Hark! The Lark inspired Homer's 1883 watercolor A Voice from the Cliffs, which he turned into an etching in 1888.

After being exhibited at the Union League Club of New York in 1890, the painting was acquired by British-American businessman Frederick Layton for the collection of the Layton Art Gallery, Milwaukee's first public museum. It has remained in Milwaukee ever since.

== See also ==
- List of paintings by Winslow Homer
