= Eight Bells (painting) =

Painting by Winslow Homer

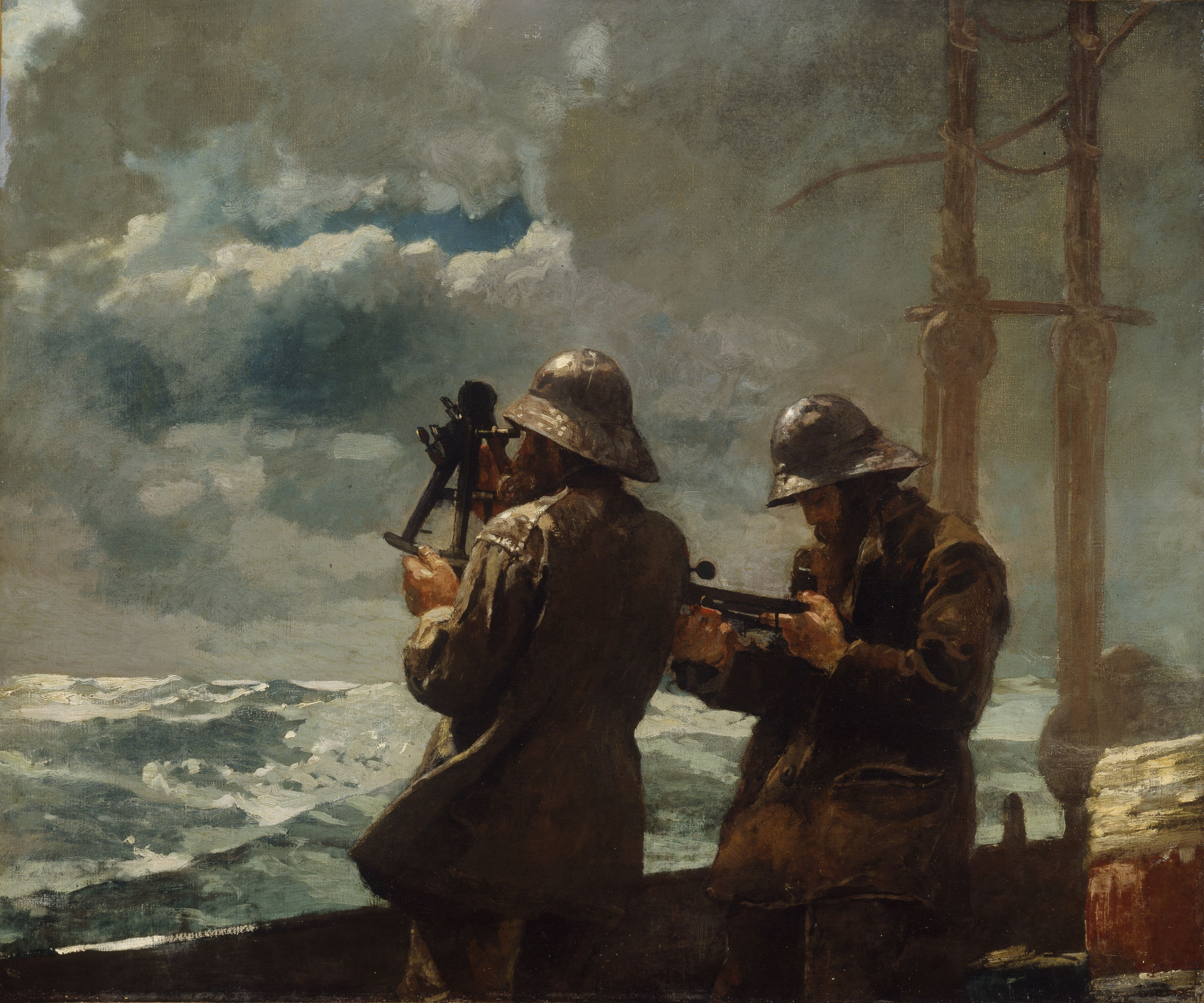
Winslow Homer. Eight Bells (1886). Oil on canvas, 64.1 × 76.5 cm (25.2 in × 30.1 in). Addison Gallery of American Art.

Eight Bells is an 1886 oil painting by the American artist Winslow Homer. It depicts two sailors determining their ship's latitude. It is one of Homer's best-known paintings and the last of his major paintings of the 1880s that dramatically chronicle man's relationship to the ocean.

== History and description ==
Eight Bells was the outgrowth of a series of oil paintings that Homer made using three wooden panels he found in the cabin of his brother's sloop at Prouts Neck, Maine. On two of the panels Homer painted scenes of mackerel fleets at Prouts Neck, one at dawn and the other at sunset; on the third he painted a grisaille study of the work that inspired Eight Bells, which depicted a ship's officer standing alone, taking an observation with an octant. Several years earlier, Homer had painted a watercolor on his voyage to England that also showed a sailor performing this activity.

The painting's title is a reference to usage of the ship's bell on the watch system, computed as one strike every 30 minutes. Although "eight bells" can be either 8 o'clock, 12 o'clock, or 4 o'clock, the painting refers to taking the "noon sight" at local apparent noon, a standard during the days of celestial navigation. Sights are also taken at dawn or dusk.

More monumental than the three panels that preceded it, the two figures dominate the foreground of Eight Bells, and the details of the ship are minimally rendered. Homer shows the figure at left using an octant to take a reading of the sun, the other apparently reading the altitude of a completed sight on his octant. The moment is prosaic, yet it is presented as a heroic image. In 1887 Homer produced an etching based on the painting, in which he further minimized the ship's rigging and diminished the area of sky, thereby focusing more on the figures.

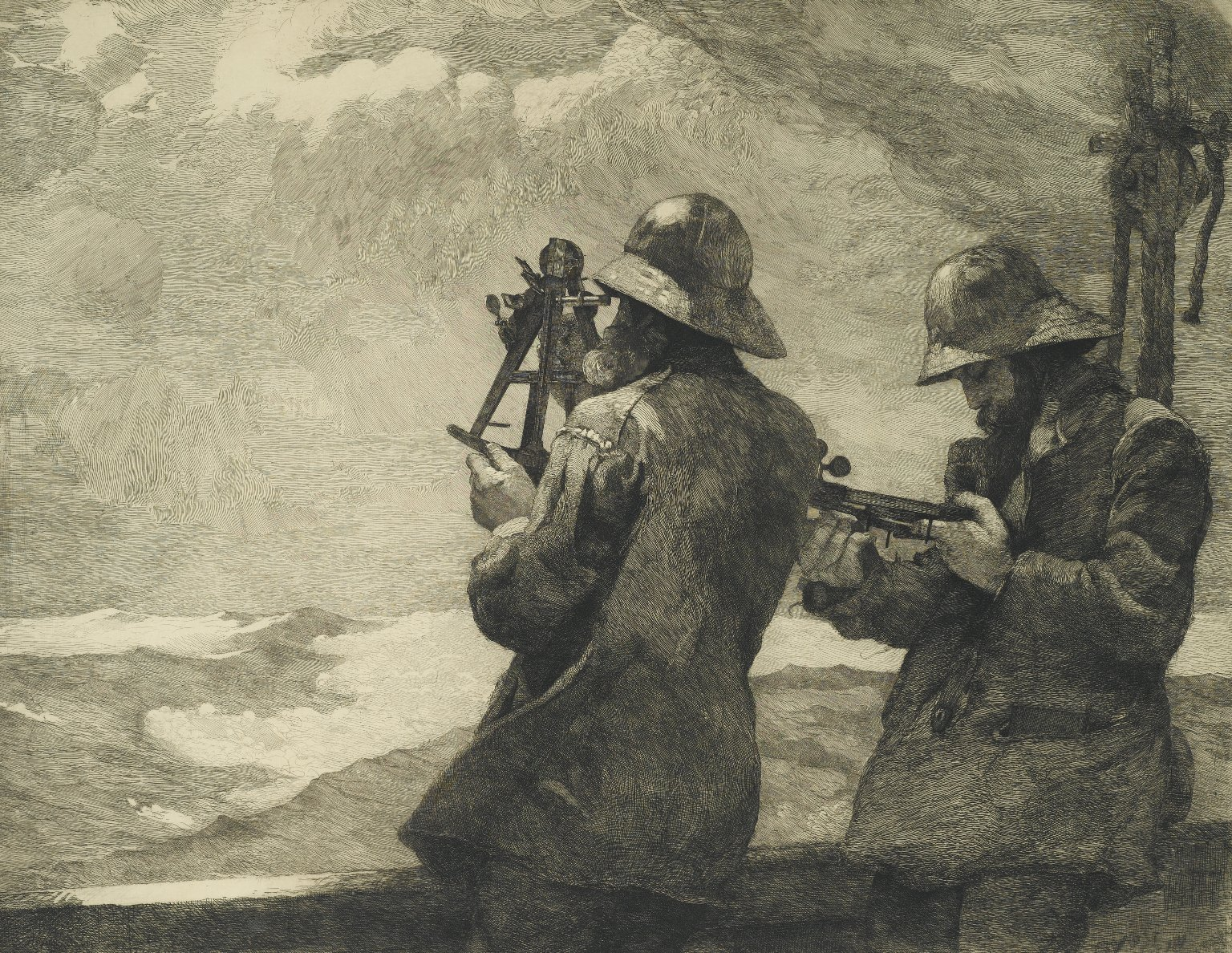
Winslow Homer. Eight Bells (1887). Etching in black ink on light beige, medium-thick, smooth-textured wove paper. 60.6 × 74.6 cm. Brooklyn Museum.

Eight Bells was painted the same year as another of Homer's major paintings, Undertow, both at a time when sales of the artist's work were slow, and he complained of "standing on one leg, one day, and another leg, some other day, and looking in vain for profits." The painting sold the following year, for the reportedly low price of $400 (approximately $13,000 today), and was the first oil painting Homer had sold in over three years. Nonetheless, Homer's disappointment in his inability to find buyers prompted him to stop painting in oils until 1890.

== Reception ==
When Eight Bells was exhibited in 1888, it was praised by critics who observed that it was more complex than a purely naturalistic rendering: "For he has caught the color and motion of the greenish waves, white-capped and rolling, the strength of the dark clouds broken with a rift of sunlight, and the sturdy, manly character of the sailors at the rail. In short, he has seen and told in a strong painter's manner what there was of beauty and interest in the scene." A later biographer wrote of the painting that the men "performing their required tasks, immediately engage our confidence in their competence to deal effectively with any situation the treachery or violence of the sea may produce."

The American artist N.C. Wyeth named his Port Clyde, Maine, home "Eight Bells" in honor of Homer's painting. He installed a reproduction of the work in his living room.

== See also ==
- List of paintings by Winslow Homer

== Sources ==
- Cikovsky, Nicolai Jr; Kelly, Franklin (1995). Winslow Homer. Washington, D.C.: National Gallery of Art. ISBN 0-89468-217-2.
- Cooper, Helen A. (1986). Winslow Homer Watercolors. Washington, D.C.: National Gallery of Art. ISBN 0-300-03695-7.
- Gardner, Albert Ten Eyck (1961). Winslow Homer, American Artist: his World and his Work. New York: Clarkson N. Potter, Inc.
- Mixter, George W. (1979). Primer of Navigation (Sixth ed.). New York: Van Nostrand Reinhold Company.
