= Maine Coast (painting) =

Painting by Winslow Homer

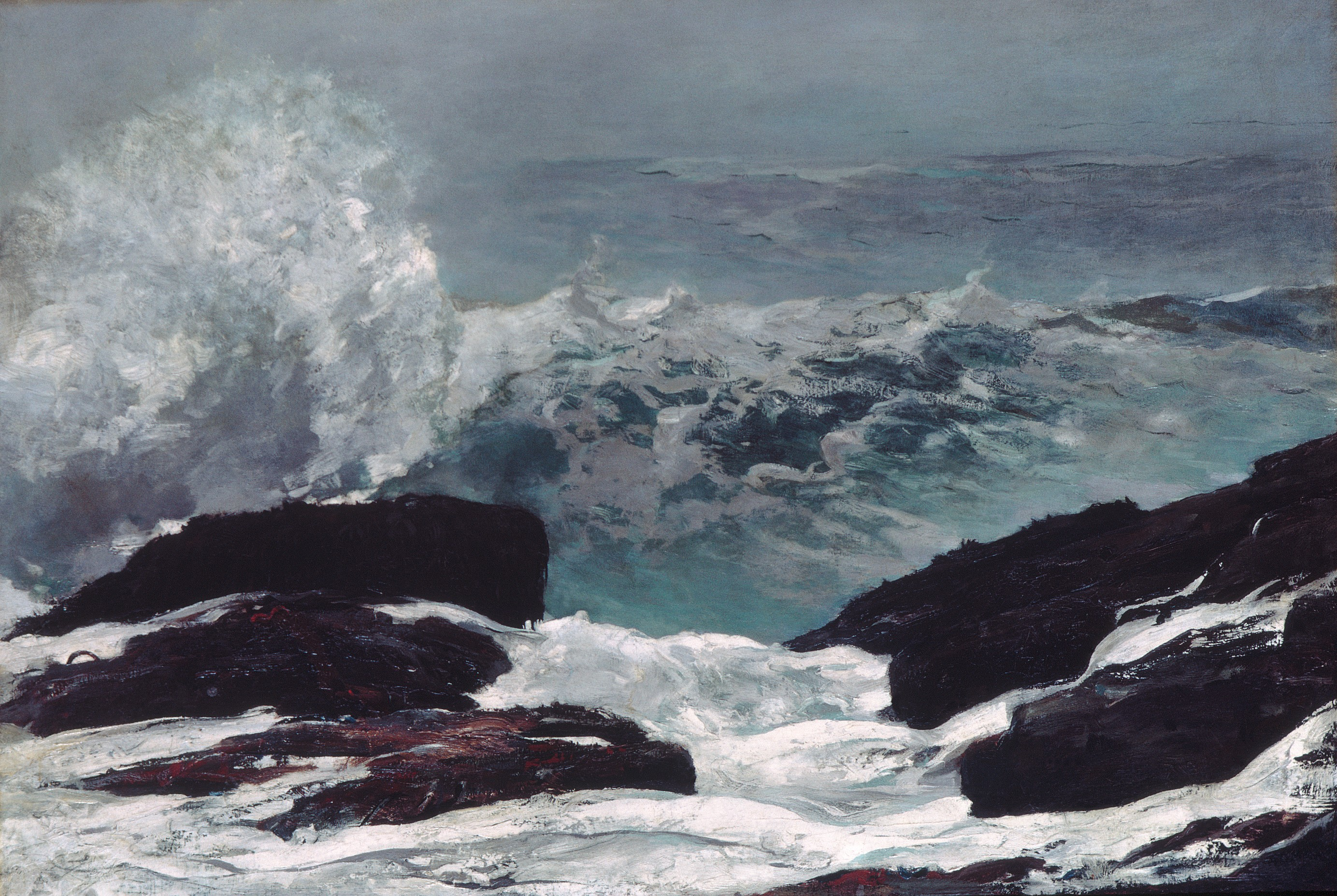
- Artist: Winslow Homer
- Year: 1896
- Medium: oil paint, canvas
- Dimensions: 76.2 cm (30.0 in) × 101.6 cm (40.0 in)
- Location: Metropolitan Museum of Art
- Accession: 11.116.1

Maine Coast is an 1896 oil painting on canvas by American artist Winslow Homer. It is part of the collection of the Metropolitan Museum of Art in New York.

The painting is a seaward view from the cliffs at Prouts Neck, Scarborough, Maine on a stormy day. A powerful wave is about to crash onto the black rocks below in a mass of white foam.

== See also ==
- 1901 in art
- List of paintings by Winslow Homer
