= Fishing Boats, Key West =

Drawing by Winslow Homer

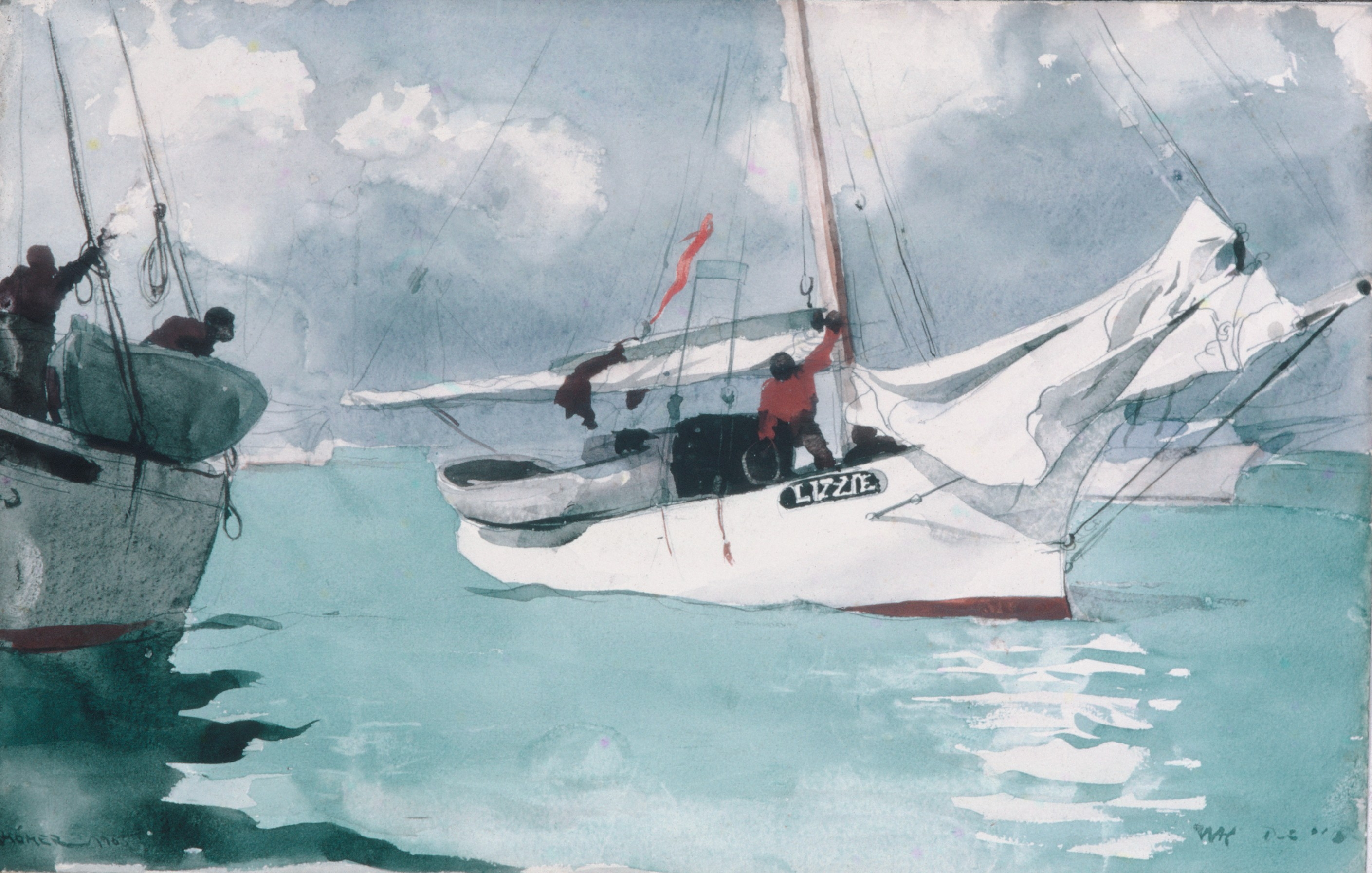
- Artist: Winslow Homer
- Year: 1903
- Dimensions: 35.4 cm (13.9 in) × 55.2 cm (21.7 in)
- Location: Metropolitan Museum of Art
- Collection: Metropolitan Museum of Art
- Accession no.: 10.228.1
- Identifiers: The Met object ID: 11120

Fishing Boats, Key West is a 1903 watercolor and graphite drawing by the American artist Winslow Homer. It is in the collection of the Metropolitan Museum of Art.

== Early history and creation ==
Homer executed a quick pencil sketch of the dimensions and layout of the image, over which he used watercolor to fully develop the forms of the clouds, sea, and boats. The highlights of the image are untouched areas of the paper.

== Description and interpretation ==
The work depicts fishing boats in the water off Key West, Florida.

== See also ==
- List of paintings by Winslow Homer
