= Moonlight, Wood Island Light =

Painting by Winslow Homer

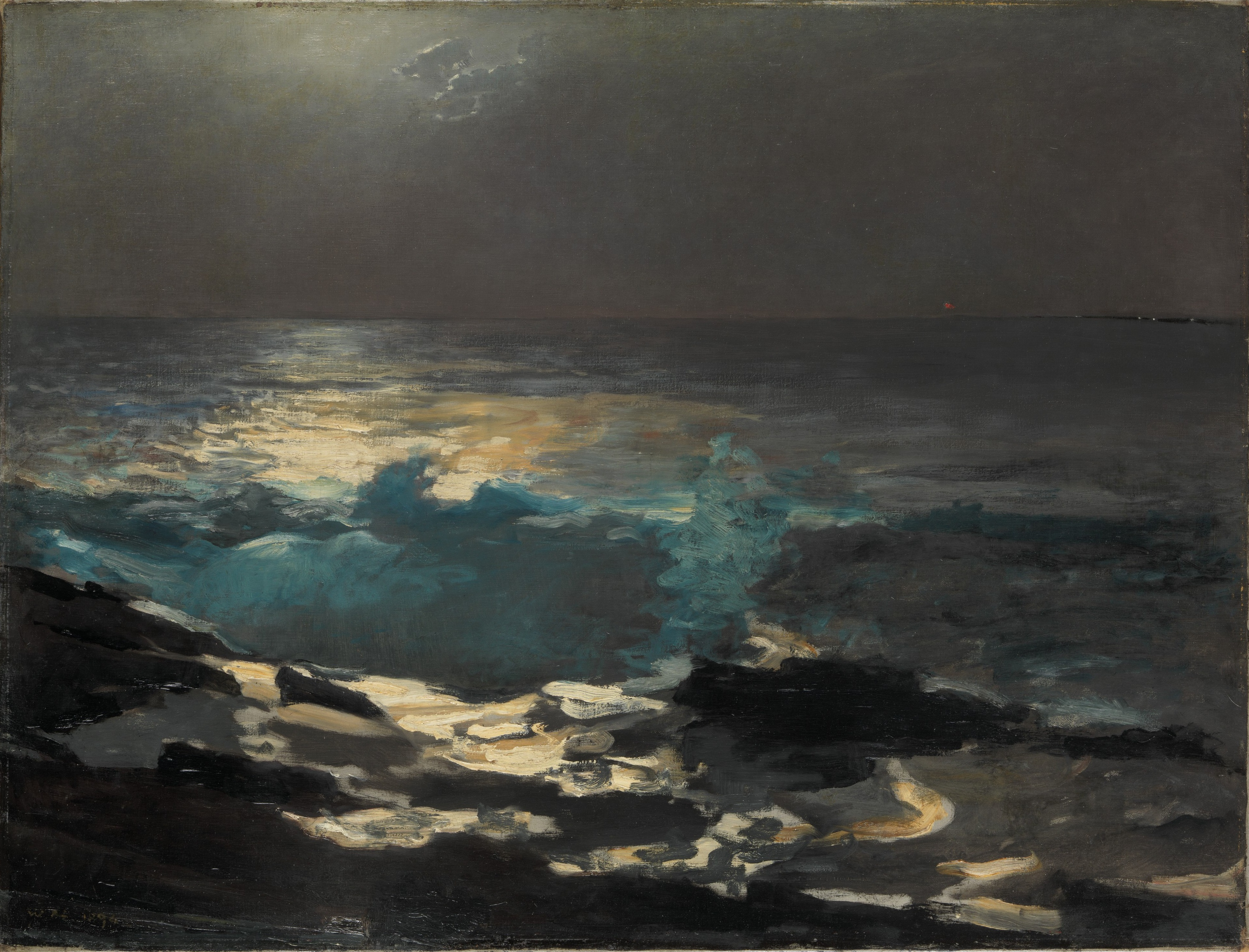
- Artist: Winslow Homer
- Year: 1894
- Medium: Oil on canvas
- Dimensions: 78.1 cm × 102.2 cm (30.7 in × 40.2 in)
- Location: Metropolitan Museum of Art; New York City
- Accession: 11.116.2

Moonlight, Wood Island Light is a late 19th-century oil painting by American artist Winslow Homer. The painting is in the collection of the Metropolitan Museum of Art in New York.

Moonlight depicts a nighttime seascape outside of Homer's studio in Portland, Maine. The tiny spot of red pigment on the horizon denotes the lighthouse on Wood Island, to the south of Prouts Neck, Scarborough, Maine.

According to his biographer, William Howe Downes, Homer painted the work on an impulse in less than five hours by the light of the Moon.

== See also ==
- List of paintings by Winslow Homer
