= In Front of Yorktown =

Painting by Winslow Homer

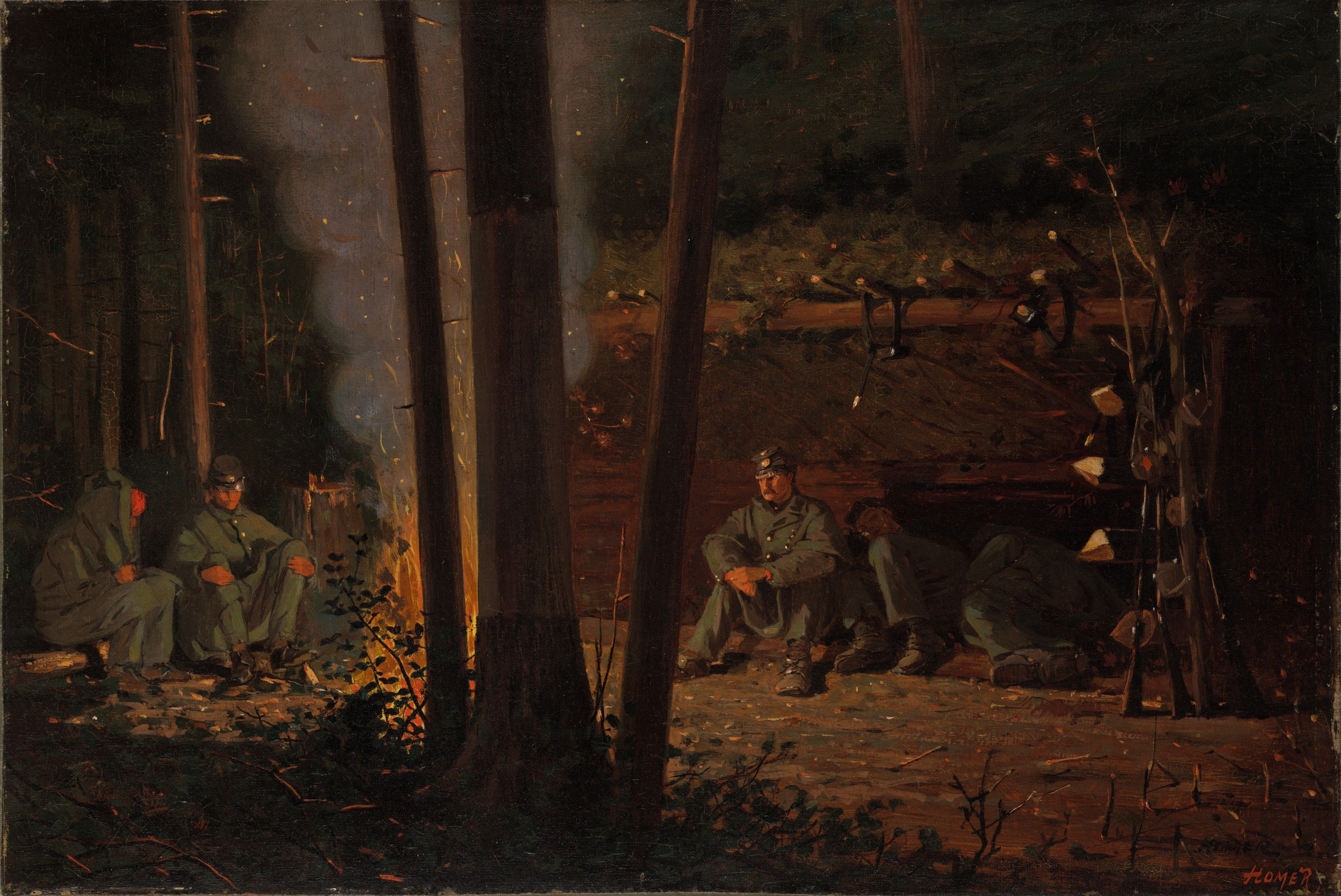
- Artist: Winslow Homer
- Year: c. 1863-1866
- Medium: Oil on canvas
- Dimensions: 33.7 cm × 50 cm (13.25 in × 19.5 in)
- Location: Yale University Art Gallery; New Haven, U.S.

In Front of Yorktown is an oil painting completed in 1863 by the American artist Winslow Homer. It depicts men from McClellan's Army of the Potomac, before the Siege of Yorktown during the American Civil War. The painting is in the collection of the Yale University Art Gallery.

== Background and historical context ==
Winslow Homer began his career as an artist reporter with Harper's Weekly in 1861. Homer first rose to prominence with this publication during the Civil War and was known for his factual approach to his subject matter. His work gave the impression of simply observing what soldiers were doing, at rest in camp, on the move, or in combat. Some of his early works were just drawings but in 1863 he began to develop fully-realized studio paintings.

This work was one of the first paintings that Homer completed in his career. It captures soldiers stationed in Yorktown. The men portrayed in the work were soldiers and leaders of General McClellan's Army. Homer depicts the moment before they embarked on the First Peninsular Campaign in the American Civil War. McClellan was tasked with recruiting soldiers and leading his army into battle. The campaign would result in a defeat for the Union army, something Homer knew by the time he painted this piece.

== Style ==
The art historian Helen Cooper classifies the work as a landscape painting with some elements of "journalistic realism". Scholars have noted Homer's decision to portray a night scene reveals his ambitions as a painter. Art historian Marc Simpson notes that night scenes are technically challenging subjects, and such a work was an impressive achievement for Homer very early in his career.

Much of Civil War art focuses on soldiers fighting on the frontlines. This painting, however, is distinctive for capturing soldiers gathered at a camp, seemingly regrouping. As the art historians Lucretia Hoover Giese and Roy Perkinson note, in this painting "soldiers instead wait, seated huddled together or alone, bivouacked in front of a lean-to, trying to sleep or staring at a fire, whose flames and sparks light up the darkness."

== Interpretations ==
Some scholars regard the painting as a meditation on the uncertainty of war. Peter Carmichael notes how Homer explores this theme by distinguishing between the experiences of officers and soldiers, who appear on opposite sides of the canvas. In the painting, only one person's facial expression can be made out in the painting – one of the officers. As Carmichael writes: "The officer is clearly preoccupied, but what thoughts engage him? Is he lost in a nostalgic dream for home? Or is he looking at the two other soldiers, whose clean uniforms suggest their newness to war? Maybe he feels the weight of an uncertain future with men that he will lead to the front."

Another interpretation emphasizes the loneliness and emptiness of war. Many art historians note that waiting and misery are key themes of the piece. The soldiers' expressionless faces convey a sense of anxiety and extreme fatigue as they sit alone waiting for the next phase of the journey.

== See also ==
- List of paintings by Winslow Homer
