= Searchlight on Harbor Entrance, Santiago de Cuba =

1902 painting by Winslow Homer

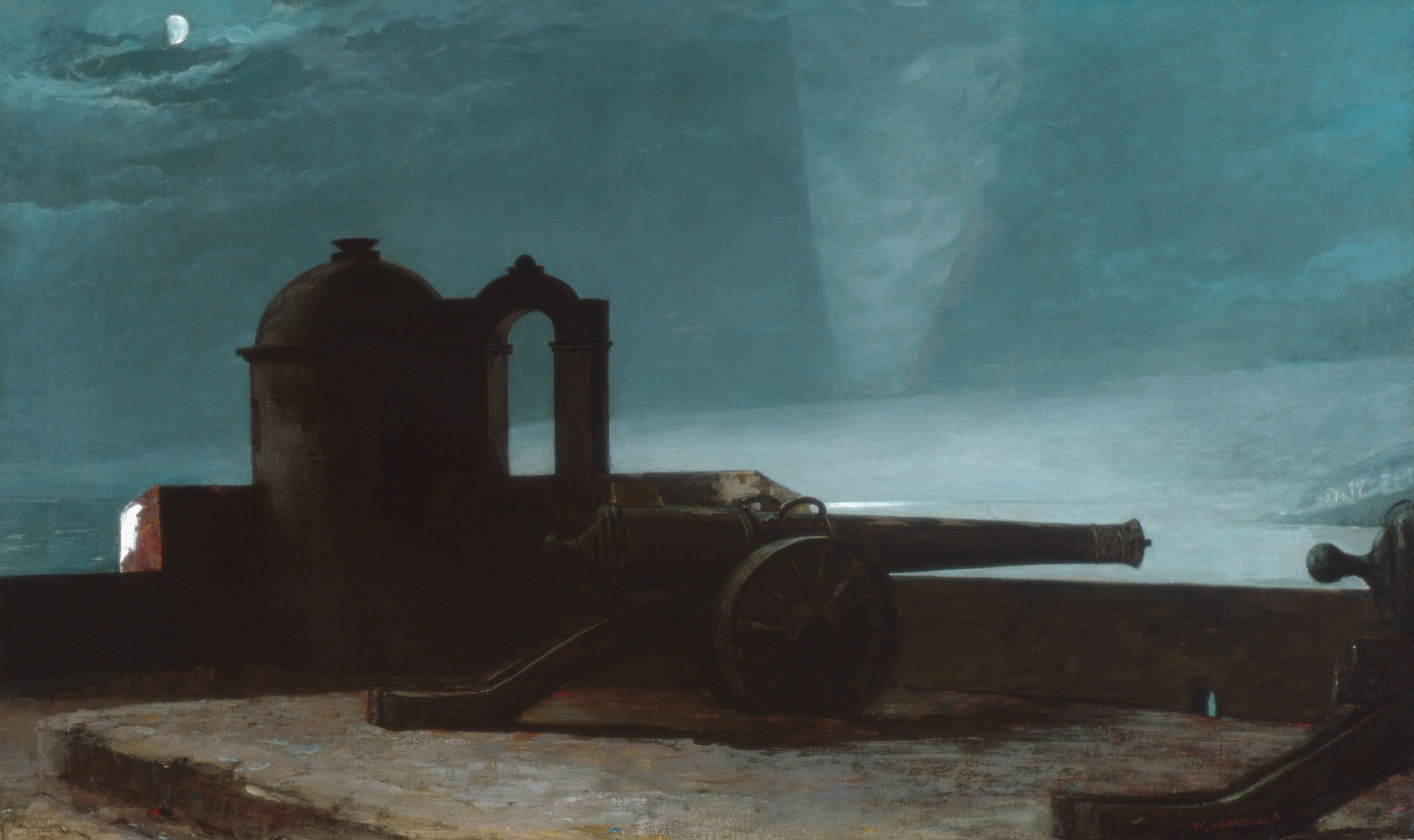
- Artist: Winslow Homer
- Year: 1902
- Medium: Oil on canvas
- Dimensions: 77.5 cm × 128.3 cm (30.5 in × 50.5 in)
- Location: Metropolitan Museum of Art, New York City
- Accession: 06.1282

Searchlight on Harbor Entrance, Santiago de Cuba is a 1902 oil-on-canvas painting by American artist Winslow Homer. It is in the collection of the Metropolitan Museum of Art in New York City, where it is displayed in Gallery 767.

Homer based the painting in part on drawings of Morro Castle that he had made during a visit to Cuba in 1885. The composition depicts the fort's old Spanish cannons and an electric searchlight used by the United States Navy during the blockade of Santiago harbor in the Spanish–American War. The searchlight was intended to prevent the Spanish fleet from leaving the harbor before it could be engaged by American forces.

The Metropolitan Museum of Art describes the painting as contrasting the antiquated cannons of the Spanish fort with the powerful rays of the modern searchlight. The work has also been interpreted as addressing the technological and imperial power imbalance surrounding the conflict and the subsequent American presence in Cuba.

== See also ==
- 1902 in art
- List of paintings by Winslow Homer
