= The Boat Builders (painting) =

Painting by Winslow Homer

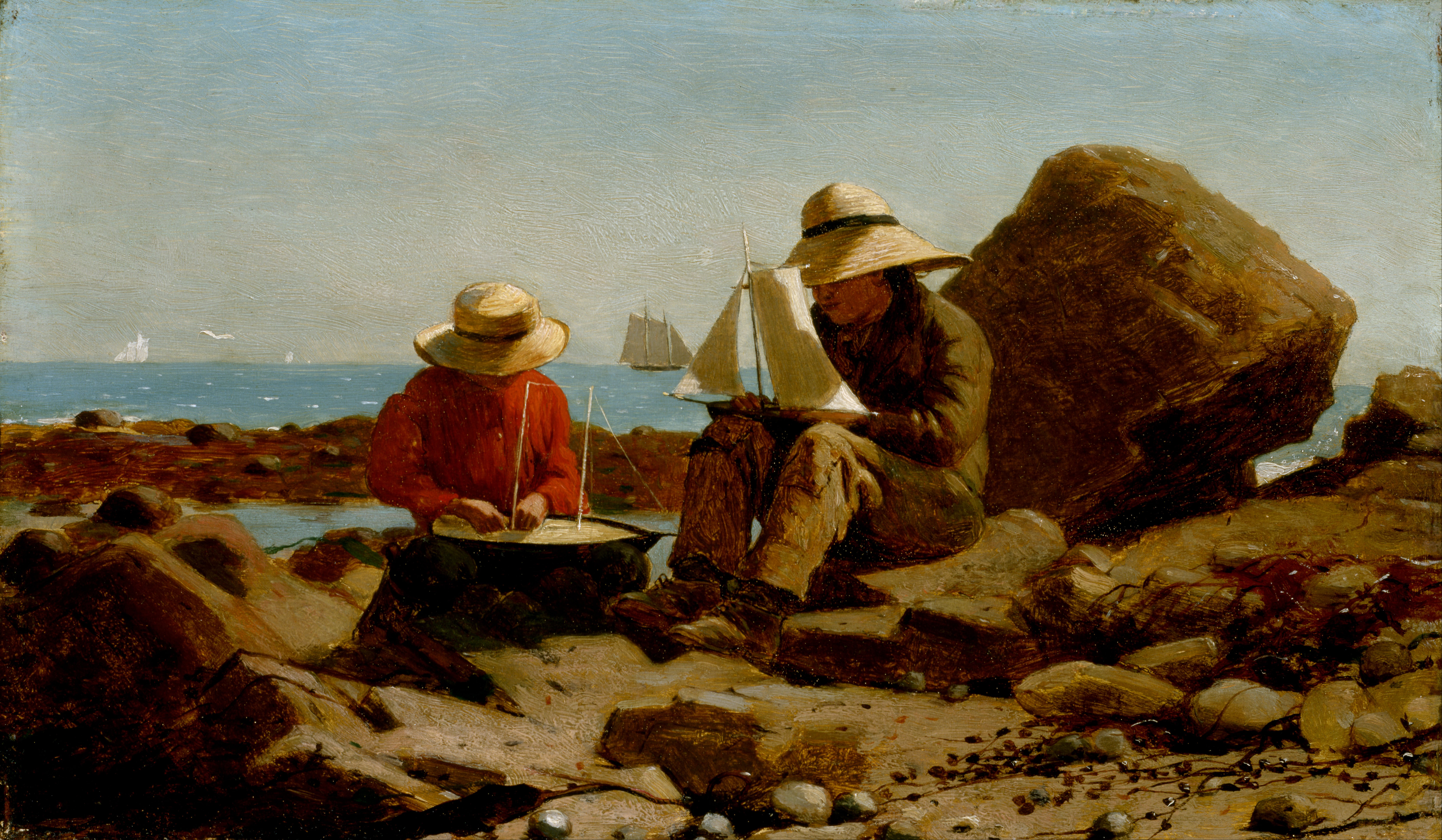
- Artist: Winslow Homer
- Year: 1873
- Medium: Oil on panel
- Dimensions: 15 cm × 26 cm (6 in × 10¼ in)
- Location: Indianapolis Museum of Art, Indianapolis, United States
- Owner: Indianapolis Museum of Art

The Boat Builders is an oil painting on panel executed in 1873 by American landscape painter Winslow Homer. It is held in the collection of the Indianapolis Museum of Art (IMA), in Indianapolis, Indiana, United States.

== Description ==
The Boat Builders depicts two young boys sitting on a rocky shoreline working on building toy boats. They both wear wide-brimmed hats, which shield their faces from the viewer. A blue sky in the background resides over the ocean, where a number of boats pass by the shore. The painting is on a mahogany panel and is signed on the lower left: "HOMER/1873"; by 1969 the date was no longer visible on the painting.

== Context ==
In 1873 Homer spent his summer in Gloucester, Massachusetts, which is where he painted The Boat Builders, as well as other works in his series of drawings and paintings about shipbuilding. The connection of the boys' toy boats and the sailing ship was sought to intertwine the imagination of the boys with the real-life experience of fishermen. It is believed that the boys' hobby suggests their future role in the ship, sea and fishing industries.

== Ownership and exhibition history ==
In the October 11, 1873, issue of Harper's Weekly the painting was reproduced as an engraving.

The painting was acquired by the IMA with funds from the Martha Delzell Memorial Fund. The Boat Builders is currently on location at the IMA's Paine Turn of the Century American Art Gallery.

== See also ==
- List of paintings by Winslow Homer

== Bibliography ==
- Indianapolis Museum of Art Bulletin. 5 (1969): 25. Indianapolis Museum of Art.
