= The Life Line (painting) =

Painting by Winslow Homer

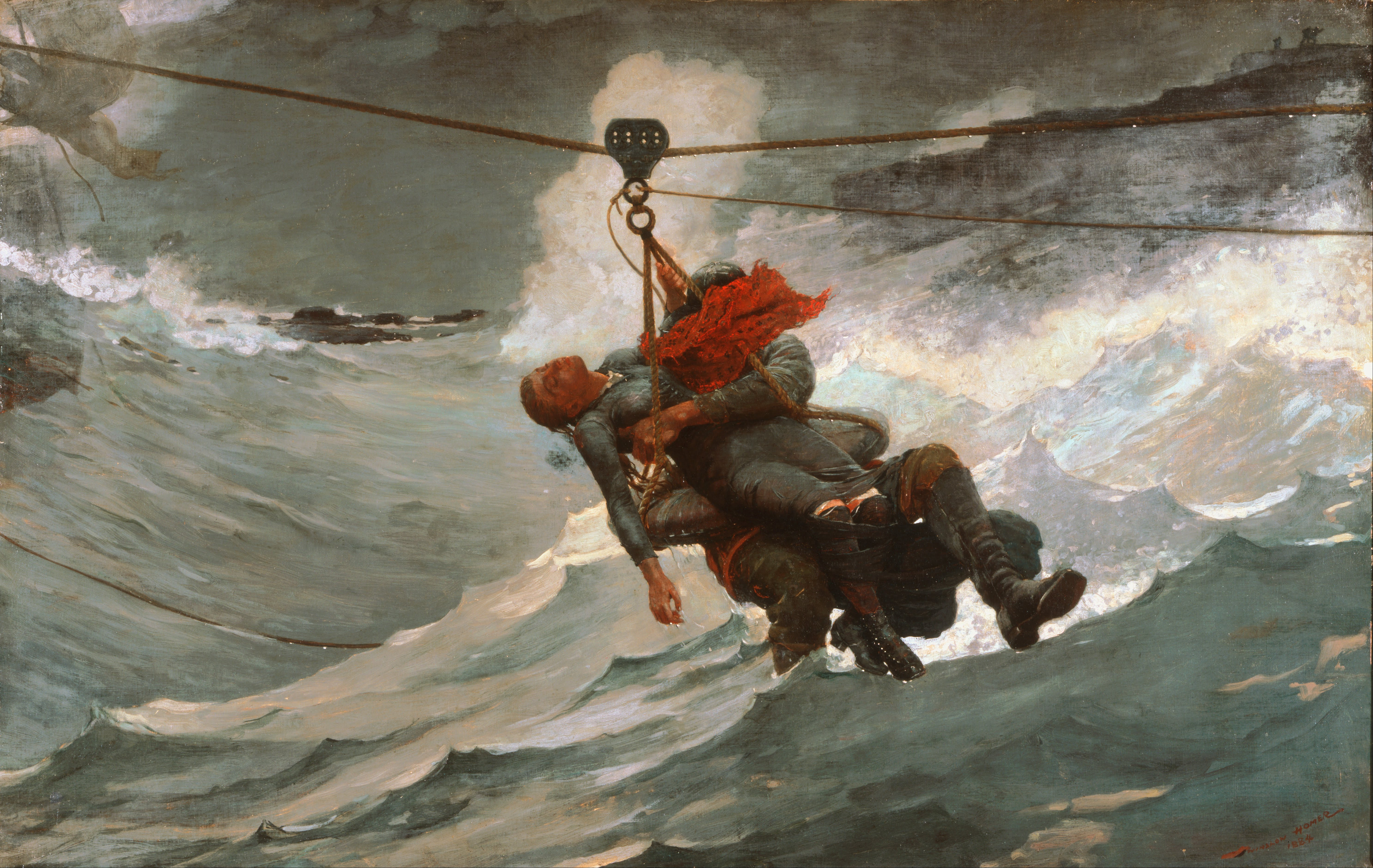
- Artist: Winslow Homer
- Year: 1884
- Medium: Oil on canvas
- Dimensions: 72.7 cm × 113.7 cm (28.6 in × 44.8 in)
- Location: Philadelphia Museum of Art; Philadelphia
- Accession: E1924-4-15

The Life Line is a late 19th-century painting by American artist Winslow Homer. Done in oil on canvas, the painting depicts the rescue of a passenger from a stricken ship. The work – one of Homer's most iconic – is in the collection of the Philadelphia Museum of Art.

== See also ==
- List of paintings by Winslow Homer
