= The Brierwood Pipe =

Painting by Winslow Homer

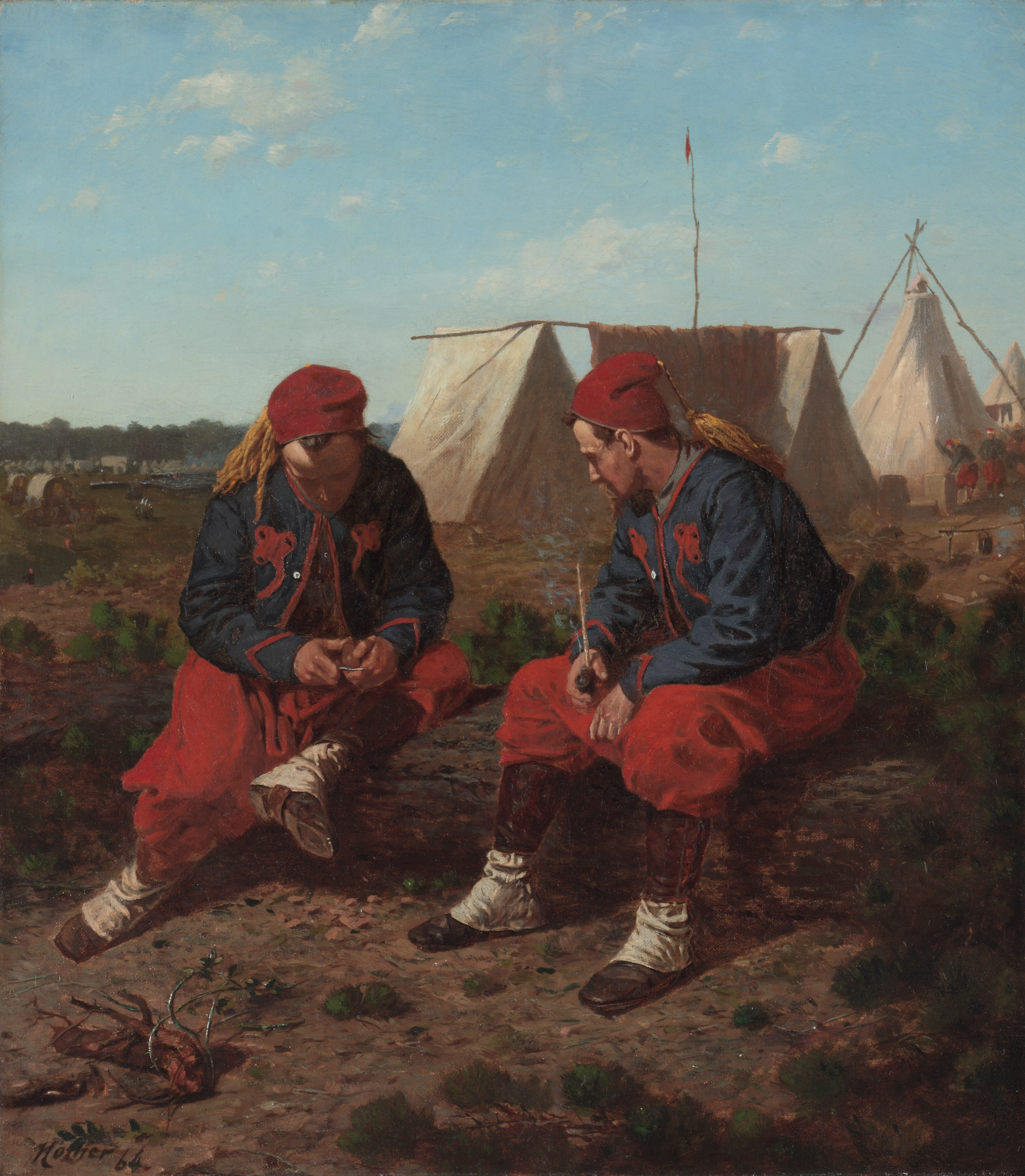
- Year: 1864
- Medium: oil paint, canvas
- Movement: American realism
- Dimensions: 42.8 cm (16.9 in) × 37.5 cm (14.8 in)
- Location: Cleveland Museum of Art
- Owner: Cleveland Museum of Art
- Accession no.: 1944.524

The Brierwood Pipe is an oil painting of 1864 by the American artist Winslow Homer. It depicts two men from the 5th New York Volunteer Infantry (Duryee Zouaves).

The title may refer to a popular poem of the day about the 5th New York Zouaves, titled "The Brier-Wood Pipe". "Two of the most famous Zouave outfits in the Army of the Potomac were from New York, Duryees and Hawkins's."

It is also known as Making Brier-root Pipes, Making Brierwood Pipes, and other similar variants.

As of 2012, the painting is on display at the Smithsonian American Art Museum, from the collection of the Cleveland Museum of Art.

== See also ==
- List of paintings by Winslow Homer
