= The Cotton Pickers =

Painting by Winslow Homer

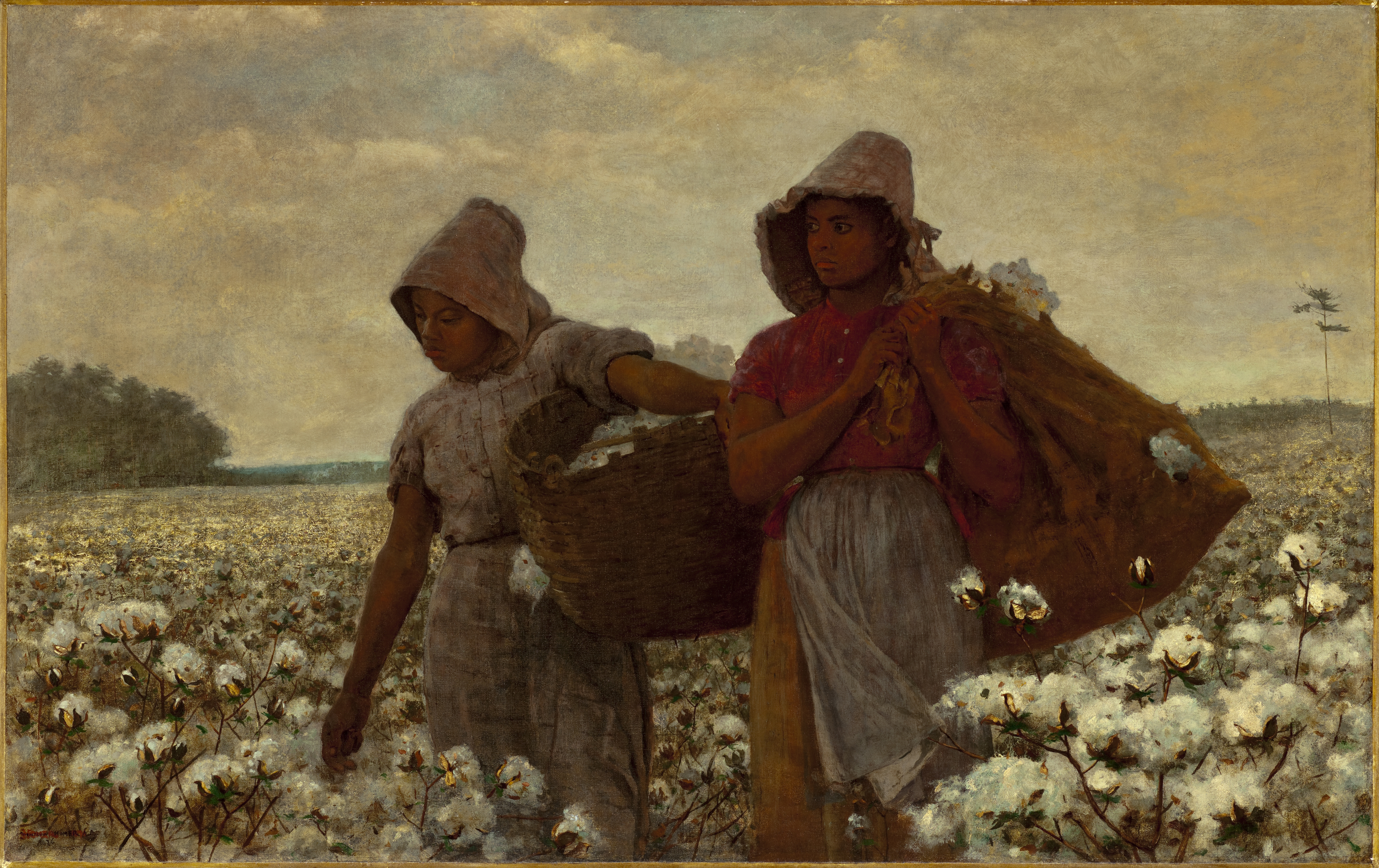
- Artist: Winslow Homer
- Year: 1876
- Medium: oil on canvas
- Dimensions: 61.12 cm × 96.84 cm (24.06 in × 38.13 in)
- Location: Los Angeles County Museum of Art, Los Angeles, California

The Cotton Pickers is an 1876 oil painting by the American artist Winslow Homer. It depicts two young African-American women in a cotton field.

Stately, silent and with barely a flicker of sadness on their faces, the two black women in the painting are unmistakable in their disillusionment: they picked cotton before the war and they are still picking cotton afterward.

The painting is in the collection of the Los Angeles County Museum of Art (LACMA).

== Background ==
Early in his artistic career, Homer apprenticed to a lithographer creating images for sheet music and other publications. After the apprenticeship ended, he began making illustrations on a regular freelance basis for the magazine Harper’s Weekly. When the Civil War began, Harper’s made him an artist-correspondent with the Army of the Potomac. Over the next few years, the artist directly witnessed and recorded life in the Union Army.

Homer made many sketches that served as the basis for magazine illustrations. Toward the end of the war, he began using them for his own paintings. The first of these to use African American subjects is a work called "The Bright Side." The piece is acknowledged as Homer’s transition from illustrator to painter. Its subject matter and small size mark the piece as illustration, while its style points to Homer’s future as a realist painter.

After the war, the artist's interest in painting the lives of former slaves led him to return visits to Petersburg, Virginia, where he had spent time during the Civil War's final siege. From 1874 to 1876, Homer made studies for and may have painted a series of watercolors and paintings of the life of rural African Americans. Because of his realistic portrayals and sensitivity towards his subjects, the painter is known as “first American consistently to paint African Americans without the prevailing attitudes of condescension and sentimentality.”

"The Cotton Pickers" is considered to be Homer's most outstanding painting depicting the post-war period.

In 1876, the year the painting was made, Federal troops were being withdrawn from the South as Reconstruction came to an end. During this period, the focus of the Federal Government shifted from aiding its vulnerable new citizens, to helping rich industrialists fight labor unions. In the post-war years preceding “The Cotton Pickers,” African-Americans had hopes of vast improvements in their lives. This optimism, however, was short lived, as continued racism and a harsher form of black codes, the Jim Crow Laws would soon be implemented.

== Description ==
In "The Cotton Pickers", Homer employs a palette of browns and silvery grays on a canvas that measures approximately 24 by 38 inches. The piece offers a realistic view of two female "slave-like" workers. The women are presented from a low vantage point, filling the canvas and dominating the composition. They are dressed in humble clothing, cotton blouses and long skirts. The colors are blurred and dim with little contrast in shadow and texture, except for the background which appears much lighter than the women. The darker colors with which the pair are painted establish the work's entire atmosphere.

Judging by the light, the scene is set in early morning. As the women have nearly filled their basket and sack, they have probably been working since before dawn. Both are silent with vivid expressions. The painter renders the pair with a combination of black and white physical characteristics. Neither woman is picking cotton. The unhappy one on the left, holding a bushel basket, stoops to brush a plant with her hand. The woman on the right, gunny sack slug across her shoulder, stands erect gazing into the distance, a poignant image of inner life and aspiration. Her demeanor might be interpreted as one of defiance or hatred. While the figures are painted as powerful and heroic, they are also portrayed as individuals.

Far into the distance, Homer places a low blue-green mountain range bordered on the left by a forest and on the right by a single pine rising high above the pale field.

== Analysis ==
Homer's contemporaries praised the artist as the first to see the possibilities of untapped subject matter. In contrast to the caricatures painted of African Americans during and after the Civil War, Homer's representation of rural workers in heroic terms drew upon a popular European style of the time. These elements are well represented in the work of French artists Jean-François Millet and Jules Breton. Homer similarly portrayed his laborers with respect and sympathy as graceful majestic figures, as well as unmistakably American subjects. "The Cotton Pickers" has been called "the artist’s most monumental painting of the figure; that it should also be of African American subjects is remarkable."

The women's slavery past is imprinted on their faces as is their future in an inevitable cycle of labor. Though the master-slave relationship was undone by the Emancipation Proclamation, slave-holding ideologies remained intact for many more years. The vast expanse of land portrayed in "The Cotton Pickers" is likely part of a large farm or plantation, indicating that the two figures are common wage laborers. No progress from the women’s labor is visible, although their basket and sack are full. The boundless nature of the field suggests that the work will never be finished. To emphasize the concept of a never-ending endeavor, Homer places the cotton plants so the viewer cannot see the laborers’ legs, providing an illusion that the pair are unable to move or escape from bondage.

The field hands are isolated in terms of color, which suggests their isolation in life. The foreground color is dense and heightened, while the background is much lighter and less intensified. The background is perceived as light and weightless, against which the darkly-painted laborers are viewed as still bound to the epoch of slavery. Despite this, the women give the impression of looking forward with thoughtfulness and determination. They stand erect, emanating the force of will to handle their difficult circumstances. In painting the background, Homer may even offer the promise of a better future. From left to right, the horizon progresses from a single tree to a forest, which might be interpreted as "one hope turning into a unified force of change."

According to a contemporary art historian, by depicting the women as mulattoes with characteristic Caucasian features such as light skin and fine facial bone structure, Homer indicates they are of mixed race parentage. Increase in the mulatto population from the mid-18th century to the mid-19th century resulted from the sexual abuse of enslaved black women by their Southern planter masters. "The Cotton Pickers" presumes the women's fathers were white plantation owners. During Homer's time, mixed-blood heritage was thought to be an obstacle to black Americans' advancement. Individuals fearful of threats to white racial purity theorized that mulattos were "doomed to biological eradication and could not reproduce beyond a few generations." Unable to sustain this heritage, "the mulatto would be denied a place in America’s future" and the world of the powerless mixed-race individual would be one in which major change for the black community could never occur. Homer's portrayal of the women as mulattoes may characterize them as having limited potential for successful futures. Reality, however, often proved quite different. Because many mulattos were born to wealthy white fathers, they often received special treatment both within the black community and from slave holding relatives.

A fellow scholar and critic concludes that in "The Cotton Pickers", "Homer creates a gap between the specificity of the realistic details and the mysterious evocativeness of the expressions and oblique glances that makes the uneasy relationship of consciousness to ordinary life the subject of the painting." His figures "look out of the frame space, beyond the physical world defined by their paintings... beckoning the "viewer to look beyond social valuations and depictions...to an appreciation of an intangible, gentle sublimity in which the individual consciousness participates, separated from the group or the social task at hand and not communicable in effects of light and color." The result is a conception of the individual as in some sense 'all dressed up with no place to go' with a consciousness that potentially will not be expressed or translated into worldly roles, actions, or identities."

== Provenance ==
The Cotton Pickers was first exhibited in 1877 at the Century Club, where Homer was a member. The painting was well received. At the initial showing, it was purchased by a wealthy cotton spinner who took the painting to England. For years, the work was relatively unknown in America. From 1911 to 1944, the piece was owned by Dr. Charles B. Guinn of Carthage, Missouri. Wildenstein & Co. held the painting from 1944 to 1947, at which time it was sold to James Cox Bandy II. Upon his death, Bandy's wife inherited the work and held it until 1977. LACMA acquired the painting in the same year.

== See also ==
- List of paintings by Winslow Homer
