= Arkell Museum =

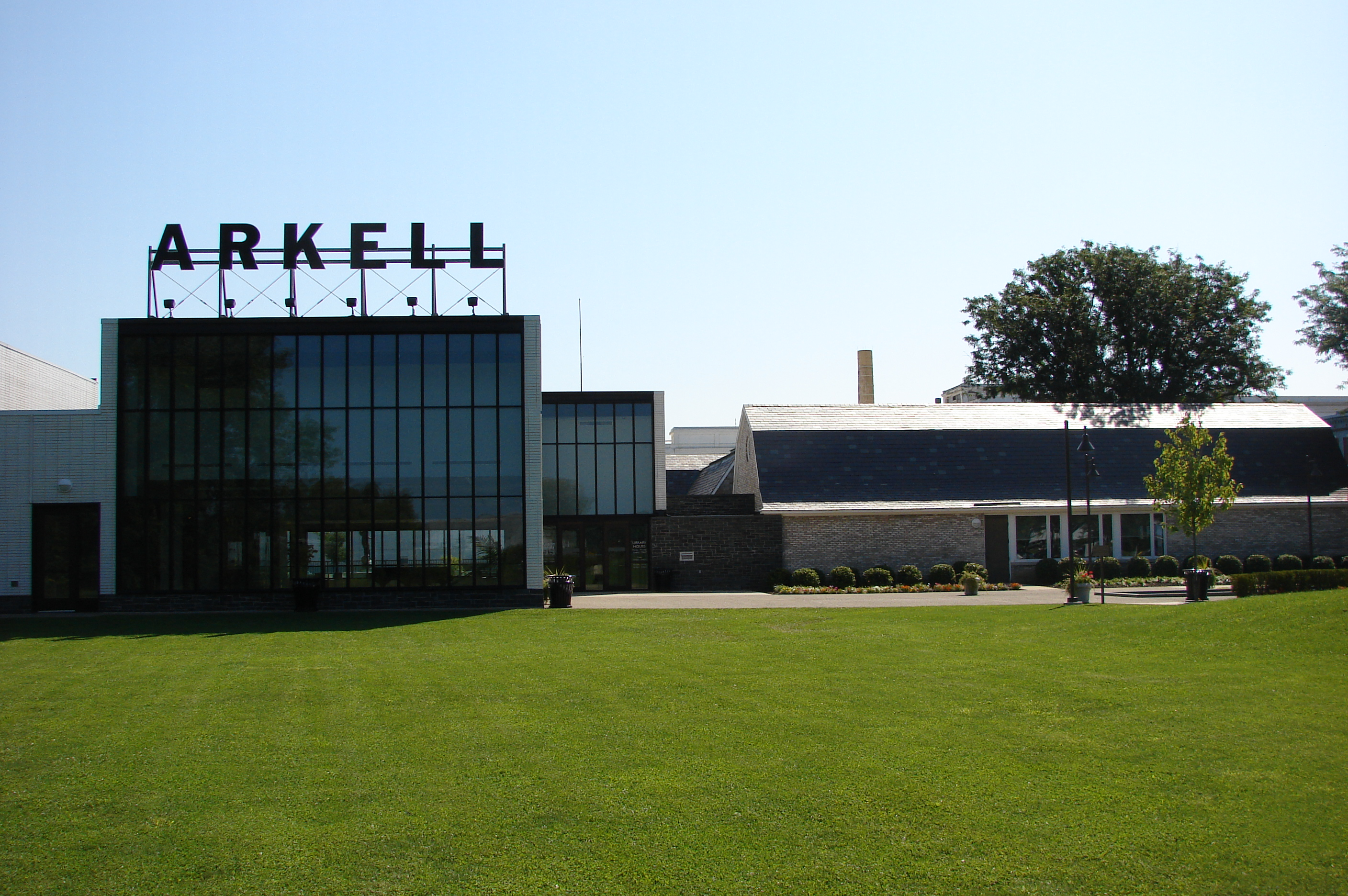
- The Arkell Museum and Canajoharie Library
- Location: Canajoharie, New York
- Coordinates: 42°54′27.0″N 074°34′18.9″W
- Type: Art Museum
- Website: AMandCL.org

The Arkell Museum is a museum in Canajoharie, New York that has an extensive collection of American paintings, primarily from 1860 to 1940, as well as historical exhibits about the history of the Mohawk River Valley and of the Beech-Nut babyfood company. The Canajoharie Library was founded in 1924, and a gallery was added in 1927. The museum was originally built to house copies of European masterpieces and original 19th-century American paintings collected by Bartlett Arkell, then the town's leading industrialist. Susan Finch has written of the museum, "The institution has evolved into more than just an art gallery with a library attached, but an art gallery with a small town attached. The roster of American painters exhibited here is astounding and completely out of scale with what you would expect from a Thruway exit between Albany and Utica."

Arkell acquired and donated some of the finest American paintings he came across. He incorporated several elements from different art museums that he visited in Europe and the United States into this museum. These were the European paintings Galleries at the Metropolitan Museum of Art, The Prince George Gallery at the Walker Art Gallery in Liverpool, England and the gallery that housed The Night Watch at the Rijksmuseum in Amsterdam, the Netherlands. Many of the paintings on display reflect Arkell's personal taste. Growing up in Canajoharie, landscapes of rural New York State and the Mohawk River are what Arkell found intriguing as well as familiar as they can be seen hanging on the museum walls

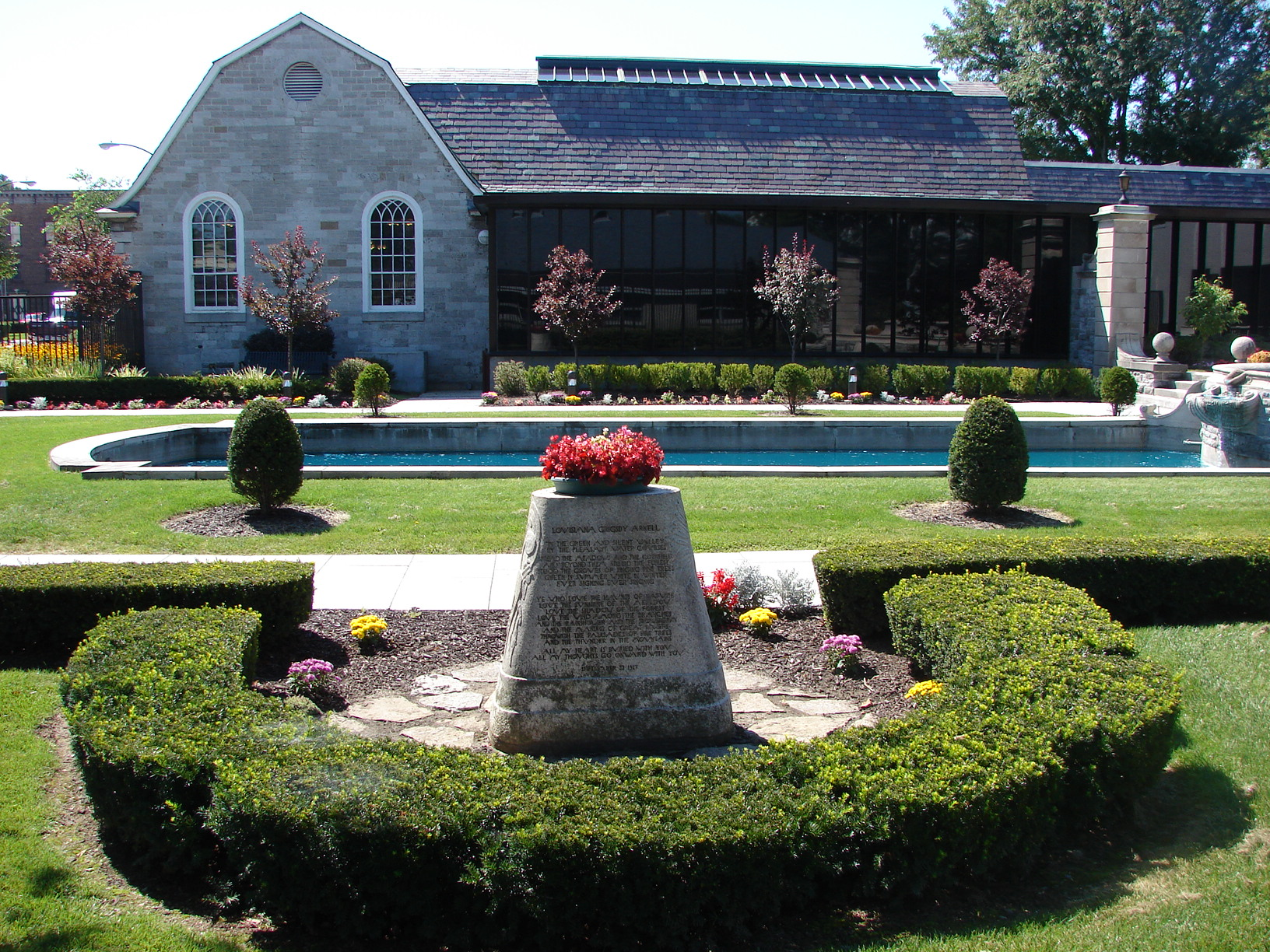

The permanent collection includes twenty-one paintings by Winslow Homer, works by all members of The Eight, and paintings by leading American Impressionists such as Childe Hassam. George Inness and Ralph Blakelock are also well represented by several works in this impressive collection. American paintings from the 20th century include realist and regionalist works by Paul Sample, Ogden Pleissner and Thomas Hart Benton.

This decorative arts collection derived from Arkell's desire to acquire objects of good taste such as furniture, sculpture, glass and pottery to place in the museum and library.
