= List of paintings by Winslow Homer =

Paintings by the American artist Winslow Homer

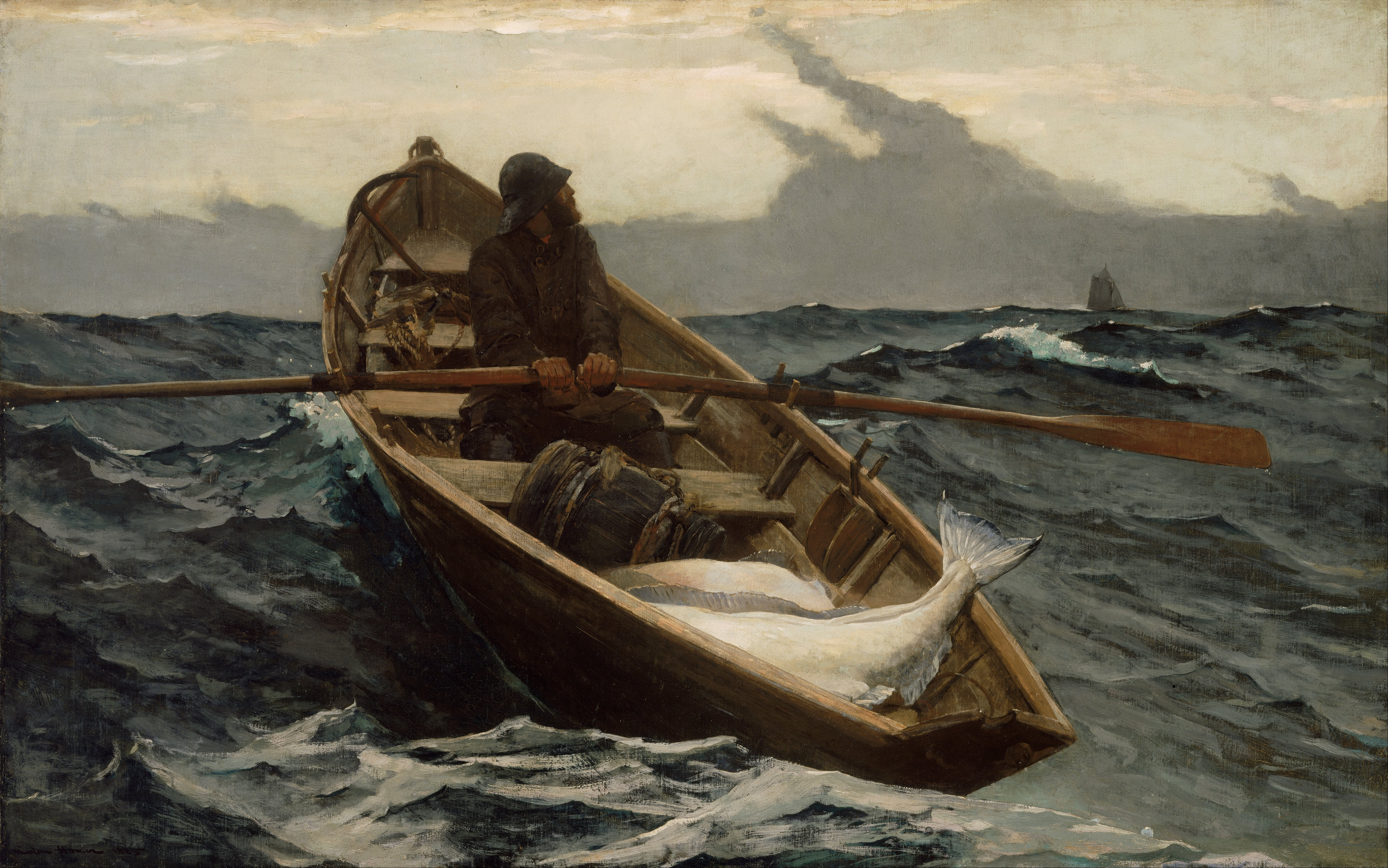
The Fog Warning (1885; Museum of Fine Arts, Boston).

This is an incomplete list of the oil paintings by the American artist Winslow Homer (February 24, 1836 – September 29, 1910).

== Paintings ==
Image	Title	Date	Medium	Dimensions	Collection	Ref.
	Sharpshooter	1863	Oil on canvas	12.25 x 16.5 in	Portland Museum of Art, Maine	
	Home, Sweet Home	1863	Oil on canvas	21.5 x 16.5 in	National Gallery of Art, Washington, D.C.	
	Playing Old Soldier	1863	Oil on canvas mounted on masonite	16 x 12 in	Museum of Fine Arts Boston, Massachusetts	
	Punishment for Intoxication (Note: Also known as In Front of the Guardhouse)	1863	Oil on canvas	17 x 13 in	Arkell Museum, New York	
	In Front of Yorktown	c. 1863–1866	Oil on canvas	13.25 x 19.5 in	Yale University Art Gallery, Connecticut	
	Albert Post (1843-1872)	1864	Oil on panel	12.5 x 10.5 in	Fine Arts Museums of San Francisco, California	
	Waverly Oaks	1864	Oil on paper mounted on panel	13.25 x 10 in	Thyssen-Bornemisza Museum, Spain	
	On Guard	1864	Oil on canvas	12.25 x 9.25 in	Terra Foundation for American Art, Illinois	
	Skirmish in the Wilderness	1864	Oil on canvas mounted on masonite	18 x 26.25 in	New Britain Museum of American Art, Connecticut	
	The Brierwood Pipe	1864	Oil on canvas	16.875 x 14.75 in	Cleveland Museum of Art, Ohio	
	Defiance: Inviting a Shot Before Petersburg	1864	Oil on panel	12 x 18 in	Detroit Institute of Arts, Michigan	
	Haymaking	1864	Oil on canvas	16 x 11 in	Columbus Museum of Art, Ohio	
	The Red Feather	1864	Oil on canvas	16.25 x 12 in	Wadsworth Atheneum Museum of Art, Connecticut	
	The Bright Side	1865	Oil on canvas	12.75 x 17 in	Fine Arts Museums of San Francisco, California	
	Croquet Players	1865	Oil on canvas	16 x 26 in	Buffalo AKG Art Museum, New York	
	Army Boots	1865	Oil on canvas	14 x 18 in	Hirshhorn Museum and Sculpture Garden, Washington, D.C.	
	Croquet Player	1865	Oil on canvas	8.125 x 12.125 in	National Academy of Design, New York	
	Old woman gathering faggots	1865	Oil on canvas	17 x 13 in	Private collection	
	The Veteran in a New Field	1865	Oil on canvas	24.125 x 38.125 in	Metropolitan Museum of Art, New York	
	Pitching Quoits	1865	Oil on canvas	26.75 x 53.75 in	Fogg Museum, Massachusetts	
	The Brush Harrow	1865	Oil on canvas	24 x 37.75 in	Fogg Museum, Massachusetts	
	Trooper Meditating Beside a Grave	1865	Oil on canvas	16 x 8 in	Joslyn Art Museum, Nebraska	
	Near Andersonville (Note: Also known as Captured Liberators and At the Cabin Door)	1865–1866	Oil on canvas	23 x 18.25 in	The Newark Museum of Art, New Jersey	
	Prisoners from the Front	1866	Oil on canvas	24 x 38 in	Metropolitan Museum of Art, New York	
	Army Teamsters	1866	Oil on canvas	18 x 28.5 in	Virginia Museum of Fine Arts, Virginia	
	Green Apples	1866	Oil on canvas	15.25 x 11.125 in	Private collection	
	Croquet Scene	1866	Oil on canvas	15.875 x 26 in	Art Institute of Chicago, Illinois	
	A Game of Croquet	1866	Oil on canvas	23.75 x 34.625 in	Yale University Art Gallery, Connecticut	
	Cerney-la-Ville – French Farm	1867	Oil on panel	10.75 x 18.25 in	Krannert Art Museum, Illinois	
	The French Farmyard	1867	Oil on panel	18.125 x 14.375 in	Cooper Hewitt, Smithsonian Design Museum, New York	
	Girl with Pitchfork	1867	Oil on canvas	24 x 10.5 in	The Phillips Collection, Washington, D.C.	
	The Gleaners	1867	Oil on panel	6 x 18 in	Terra Foundation for American Art, Illinois	
	The Nurse	1867	Oil on panel	19 x 11 in	Terra Foundation for American Art, Illinois	
	Haymakers	1867	Oil on canvas	13.125 x 18.25 in	Terra Foundation for American Art, Illinois	
	Wheat Gatherer	1867	Oil on canvas	9.625 x 12.25 in	Frye Art Museum, Washington	
	Portrait of Pauline	1867	Oil on canvas	22 x 15 in	Colby College Museum of Art, Maine	
	The Return of the Gleaner	1867	Oil on canvas	24 x 18 in	Crystal Bridges Museum of American Art, Arkansas	
	Man With A Scythe	1867	Oil on canvas	17.125 x 22 in	Cooper Hewitt, Smithsonian Design Museum, New York	
	The Studio	1867	Oil on canvas	18 x 15 in	Metropolitan Museum of Art, New York	
	Women Working in a Field	1867	Oil on panel	6.75 x 12.625 in	Cleveland Museum of Art, Ohio	
	In the Wheat Field	1867	Oil on canvas	18 x 12 in	Figge Art Museum, Iowa	
	Coming Through the Rye	1867	Oil on canvas	16.75 x 11.625 in	Private collection	
	The Cellist	1867–1869	Oil on canvas	19.125 x 12.875 in	Baltimore Museum of Art, Maryland	
	Croquet Match	1868	Oil on paperboard	9.75 x 15.625 in	Terra Foundation for American Art, Illinois	
	The Bridle Path, White Mountains	1868	Oil on canvas	24.125 x 38 in	Clark Art Institute, Massachusetts	
	White Mare	1868	Oil on panel	7.875 x 12.875 in	Cleveland Museum of Art, Ohio	
	Artists Sketching in the White Mountains	1868	Oil on panel	9.5 x 15.875 in	Portland Museum of Art, Maine	
	Saddle Horse	1869	Oil on panel	11.375 x 14.375 in	Virginia Museum of Fine Arts, Virginia	
	Lobster Cove, Manchester, Massachusetts	1869	Oil on panel	12.375 x 21.25 in	Cooper Hewitt, Smithsonian Design Museum, New York	
	Sandy Beach with Breakers	1869	Oil on canvas	10.25 x 21.75 in	Cooper Hewitt, Smithsonian Design Museum, New York	
	Mountain Wagon	1869	Oil on panel	11.75 x 15.875 in	Cooper Hewitt, Smithsonian Design Museum, New York	
	Beach Scene	1869	Oil on canvas	11.5 x 9.5 in	Thyssen-Bornemisza Museum, Spain	
	A Mountain Climber Resting	1869	Oil on canvas	10.5 x 14.5 in	Private collection	
	Study for Eagle Head, Manchester, Massachusetts	1869	Oil on panel	9.5 x 21.25 in	Metropolitan Museum of Art, New York	
	Mount Washington	1869	Oil on canvas	16.25 x 24.375 in	Art Institute of Chicago, Illinois	
	Rocky Coast and Gulls	1869	Oil on canvas	16.25 x 28.125 in	Museum of Fine Arts Boston, Massachusetts	
	Long Branch, New Jersey	1869	Oil on canvas	16 x 21.75 in	Museum of Fine Arts Boston, Massachusetts	
	On the Beach	1869	Oil on canvas	16 x 25 in	Arkell Museum, New York	
	Feeding the Chickens	1870	Oil on canvas	12 x 18 in	Arkell Museum, New York	
	The School Mistress	1870	Oil on canvas	18.75 x 15.625 in	Worcester Art Museum, Massachusetts	
	The Trapper	1870	Oil on canvas	19.125 x 29.5 in	Colby College Museum of Art, Maine	
	An Adirondack Lake	1870	Oil on canvas	24.25 x 38.25 in	Henry Art Gallery, Washington	
	Eagle Head, Manchester, Massachusetts (High Tide)	1870	Oil on canvas	26 x 38 in	Metropolitan Museum of Art, New York	
	Saddle Horse in Farm Yard	1870	Oil on panel	12.75 x 15.875 in	Metropolitan Museum of Art, New York	
	The Dinner Horn (Blowing the Horn at Seaside)	1870	Oil on canvas	19.25 x 13.75 in	National Gallery of Art, Washington, D.C.	
	The Dinner Horn	1870	Oil on panel	5.625 x 9 in	Museum of Fine Arts Boston, Massachusetts	
	Grace Hoops	1870	Oil on canvas	12 x 7 in	Carnegie Museum of Art, Pennsylvania	
	Evening	1870	Oil on canvas	12 x 18 in	Portland Museum of Art, Maine	
	By the Shore	1870	Oil on canvas	9.5 x 10 in	Private collection	
	The Beach, Late Afternoon	1870–1872	Oil on panel	9.25 x 21 in	Metropolitan Museum of Art, New York	
	Rainy Day in Camp	1871	Oil on canvas	20 x 36 in	Metropolitan Museum of Art, New York	
	Old Mill (The Morning Bell)	1871	Oil on canvas	24 x 38.125 in	Yale University Art Gallery, Connecticut	
	Shipyard at Gloucester	1871	Oil on canvas	13.5 x 19.75 in	Smith College Museum of Art, Massachusetts	
	The Country School	1871	Oil on canvas	21.25 x 38.25 in	Saint Louis Art Museum, Missouri	
	Crossing the Pasture	1871–1872	Oil on canvas	26.25 x 38 in	Amon Carter Museum of American Art, Texas	
	Evening on the Beach	1871–1878	Oil on canvas	12 x 19 in	Colby College Museum of Art, Maine	
	Snap the Whip	1872	Oil on canvas	22 x 36 in	Butler Institute of American Art, Ohio	
	The Butterfly	1872	Oil on canvas	15.625 x 22.75 in	Cooper Hewitt, Smithsonian Design Museum, New York	
	Summer Afternoon	1872	Oil on canvas	22.5 x 15.625 in	Cooper Hewitt, Smithsonian Design Museum, New York	
	Portrait of Helena de Kay	1872	Oil on panel	12.25 x 18.5 in	Thyssen-Bornemisza Museum, Spain	
	At the Window	1872	Oil on canvas	22.5 x 15.75 in	Princeton Art Museum, New Jersey	
	Waiting an Answer	1872	Oil on canvas	12.5 x 17 in	Baltimore Museum of Art, Maryland	
	The Country Store	1872	Oil on panel	11.875 x 18.125 in	Hirshhorn Museum and Sculpture Garden, Washington, D.C.	
	On the Beach at Marshfield	1872	Oil on canvas	13.125 x 21.625 in	Private collection	
	Reverie	1872	Oil on canvas	22 x 13.5 in	Private collection	
	Snap the Whip	1872	Oil on canvas	12 x 20 in	Metropolitan Museum of Art, New York	
	An Open Window	1872	Oil on canvas	18.75 x 14 in	Portland Museum of Art, Maine	
	The Nooning	1872	Oil on canvas	13.375 x 19.625 in	Wadsworth Atheneum Museum of Art, Connecticut	
	Farmyard with Ducks and Chickens	1872–1873	Oil on canvas	15.75 x 22.75 in	Cooper Hewitt, Smithsonian Design Museum, New York	
	Farmyard Scene	1872–1874	Oil on canvas	12.375 x 18.375 in	Clark Art Institute, Massachusetts	
	Girl in a Hammock	1873	Oil on canvas	13.25 x 19.75 in	Colby College Museum of Art, Maine	
	Young Man Reading	1873	Oil on canvas	14 x 16 in	Baltimore Museum of Art, Maryland	
	Sunlight and Shadow (Note: Also known as In the Hammock)	1873	Oil on canvas	15.875 x 22.625 in	Cooper Hewitt, Smithsonian Design Museum, New York	
	Girl Shelling Peas	1873	Oil on canvas	38.25 x 24.375 in	Cooper Hewitt, Smithsonian Design Museum, New York	
	Man with a Knapsack	1873	Oil on canvas	15.25 x 22.375 in	Cooper Hewitt, Smithsonian Design Museum, New York	
	Autumn Tree Tops	1873	Oil on canvas	13.5 x 20 in	Cooper Hewitt, Smithsonian Design Museum, New York	
	A Country Lad	1873	Oil on canvas	22.75 x 15.625 in	Cooper Hewitt, Smithsonian Design Museum, New York	
	Girls in a Landscape	1873	Oil on panel	6 x 8 in	Terra Foundation for American Art, Illinois	
	The Whittling Boy	1873	Oil on canvas	15.75 x 22.625 in	Terra Foundation for American Art, Illinois	
	Country School	1873	Oil on canvas	12.25 x 18.75 in	Addison Gallery of American Art, Massachusetts	
	The Noon Recess	1873	Oil on canvas	16.5 x 21.25 in	Colby College Museum of Art, Maine	
	Children on the Beach (Note: Also known as Watching the Tide Go Out and Watching the Boats)	1873	Oil on canvas	12.625 x 16.5 in	Private collection	
	Breezing Up (Note: Also known as A Fair Wind)	1873	Oil on canvas	24.25 x 38.25 in	National Gallery of Art, Washington, D.C.	
	The Boat Builders	1873	Oil on panel	6 x 10.25 in	Indianapolis Museum of Art, Indiana	
	Dad's Coming!	1873	Oil on panel	9 x 13.75 in	National Gallery of Art, Washington, D.C.	
	Harvest Scene	1873	Oil on canvas	10 x 24 in	Metropolitan Museum of Art, New York	
	The Red School House	1873	Oil on canvas	21.875 x 15.5 in	National Gallery of Art, Washington, D.C.	
	Gloucester Harbor	1873	Oil on canvas	15.5 x 22.375 in	The Nelson-Atkins Museum of Art, Missouri	
	The Four-Leaf Clover	1873	Oil on canvas	14.25 x 20.375 in	Detroit Institute of Arts, Michigan	
	The Dinner Horn	1873	Oil on canvas	11.875 x 14.25 in	Detroit Institute of Arts, Michigan	
	In the Wheatfield (Note: Also known as Girl Standing in a Wheat Field)	1873	Oil on canvas	22.5 x 14 in	Private collection	
	Three Boys in a Dory	1873	Oil on panel	5.875 x 10 in	Private collection	
	Young Farmers	1873–1874	Oil on canvas	13.625 x 11.5 in	Portland Museum of Art, Maine	
	Farmer with a Pitchfork	1874	Oil on cardboard	17 x 21 in	Chrysler Museum of Art, Virginia	
	Waiting for a Bite	1874	Oil on canvas	12 x 20 in	Cummer Museum of Art and Gardens, Florida	
	Haystacks and Children	1874	Oil on canvas	15.5 x 22.5 in	Cooper Hewitt, Smithsonian Design Museum, New York	
	The Tent (Note: Also known as Summer by the Sea)	1874	Oil on cardboard	9.5 x 22 in	Fleming Museum of Art, Vermont	
	Corn Husking	1874	Oil on canvas	14 x 22 in	Arizona State University Art Museum, Arizona	
	East Hampton Beach, Long Island	1874	Oil on canvas	10.25 x 21.75 in	National Gallery of Art, Washington, D.C.	
	The Flirt	1874	Oil on wood	8.5 x 12 in	National Gallery of Art, Washington, D.C.	
	School Time	1874	Oil on canvas	12.5 x 19.25 in	National Gallery of Art, Washington, D.C.	
	Boys in a Pasture	1874	Oil on canvas	15.875 x 22.875 in	Museum of Fine Arts Boston, Massachusetts	
	A Temperance Meeting	1874	Oil on canvas	20.375 x 30.125 in	Philadelphia Museum of Art, Pennsylvania	
	Young Girl	1874	Oil on canvas	22.25 x 14.625 in	Yale University Art Gallery, Connecticut	
	Girl with Pail	Date unknown	Oil on panel	12.125 x 9.125 in	Hirshhorn Museum and Sculpture Garden, Washington, D.C.	
	Returning from the Spring	1874	Oil on panel	7.875 x 5.75 in	Portland Museum of Art, Maine	
	Enchanted (Note: Also known as Flirting on the Meadow)	1874	Oil on canvas	12 x 20 in	Hood Museum of Art, New Hampshire	
	Winding Line	1874	Oil on canvas	15.75 x 22.75 in	Minnesota Marine Art Museum, Minnesota	
	Girl in the Orchard	1874	Oil on canvas	15.625 x 22.625 in	Columbus Museum of Art, Ohio	
	The Rooster	1874	Oil on canvas	21.375 x 20.125 in	Arkell Museum, New York	
	Beaver Mountain, Adirondacks; Minerva, New York	1874–1877	Oil on canvas	12.125 x 17.125 in	The Newark Museum of Art, New Jersey	
	Girl with a Four-Leaf Clover	1875	Oil on panel	8 x 12.5 in	Chrysler Museum of Art, Virginia	
	Weaning the Calf	1875	Oil on canvas	24 x 38 in	North Carolina Museum of Art, Raleigh	
	Milking	1875	Oil on canvas	15.5 x 22.75 in	Shelburne Museum, Vermont	
	Robert Junkins' Garrison House, York, Maine	1875	Oil on canvas	22.5 x 15.625 in	Cooper Hewitt, Smithsonian Design Museum, New York	
	Playing a Fish	1875	Oil on canvas	11.75 x 18.875 in	Clark Art Institute, Massachusetts	
	Milking Time	1875	Oil on canvas	24 x 38.25 in	Crystal Bridges Museum of American Art, Arkansas	
	Sunset	1875	Oil on canvas	15.5 x 22.5 in	National Gallery of Art, Washington, D.C.	
	Song of the Lark	1876	Oil on canvas	38.75 x 24.25 in	Chrysler Museum of Art, Virginia	
	Answering the Horn (Note: Also known as The Home Signal)	1876	Oil on canvas		Muskegon Museum of Art, Michigan	
	The Cotton Pickers	1876	Oil on canvas	24 x 38.125 in	Los Angeles County Museum of Art, California	
	The Watermelon Boys	1876	Oil on canvas	24.125 x 38.125 in	Cooper Hewitt, Smithsonian Design Museum, New York	
	The Bean Picker	1876	Oil on canvas	22.625 x 15.875 in	Cooper Hewitt, Smithsonian Design Museum, New York	
	Adirondack Guide	1876	Oil on panel	11.625 x 7.25 in	The Hyde Collection, New York	
	A Visit from the Old Mistress	1876	Oil on canvas	18 x 24 in	Smithsonian American Art Museum, Washington, D.C.	
	Twilight at Leeds, New York	1876	Oil on fiberboard on canvas	24.125 x 28 in	Museum of Fine Arts Boston, Massachusetts	
	Sketch of a Cottage Yard	1876	Oil on cardboard	10.25 x 14.5 in	National Gallery of Art, Washington, D.C.	
	Boy and Girl in a Field with Sheep	1877	Oil on canvas	22.5 x 15.375 in	Cooper Hewitt, Smithsonian Design Museum, New York	
	Two Girls with Sunbonnets in a Field	1877	Oil on canvas	15.625 x 22.5 in	Cooper Hewitt, Smithsonian Design Museum, New York	
	Gathering Autumn Leaves	1877	Oil on panel	24.25 x 38.25 in	Cooper Hewitt, Smithsonian Design Museum, New York	
	Woman in Autumn Woods	1877	Oil on canvas	35.125 x 24 in	Santa Barbara Museum of Art, California	
	Two Guides	1877	Oil on canvas	24.25 x 38.25 in	Clark Art Institute, Massachusetts	
	Dressing for the Carnival	1877	Oil on canvas	20 x 30 in	Metropolitan Museum of Art, New York	
	Autumn	1877	Oil on canvas	38.25 x 23.25 in	National Gallery of Art, Washington, D.C.	
	In the Mountains	1877	Oil on canvas	23.875 x 38.125 in	Brooklyn Museum, New York	
	Sunday Morning in Virginia	1877	Oil on canvas	18.375 x 24 in	Cincinnati Art Museum, Ohio	
	Charles Prentice Howland	1878	Oil on canvas	21.125 x 13.25 in	Clark Art Institute, Massachusetts	
	Butterflies	1878	Oil on canvas mounted on masonite	37.75 x 24 in	New Britain Museum of American Art, Connecticut	
	Girl Seated in a Garden	1878	Oil on canvas	21.5 x 13.75 in	Virginia Museum of Fine Arts, Richmond	
	Peach Blossoms	1878	Oil on canvas	13.25 x 19.25 in	Art Institute of Chicago, Illinois	
	Shepherdess and Sheep	1878	Oil on canvas	15.5 x 22.5 in	Arkell Museum, New York	
	Woman Driving Geese	1878–1879	Oil on canvas	15.5 x 22.5 in	Phoenix Art Museum, Arizona	
	Reading by the Brook	1879	Oil on canvas	15.875 x 22.75 in	Memphis Brooks Museum of Art, Tennessee	
	The Yellow Jacket	1879	Oil on canvas	29.75 x 23.625 in	Cooper Hewitt, Smithsonian Design Museum, New York	
	Girl Picking Apple Blossoms	1879	Oil on canvas	15.75 x 22.75 in	Cooper Hewitt, Smithsonian Design Museum, New York	
	Fishin'	1879	Oil on canvas	7.25 x 9.125 in	Rhode Island School of Design Museum, Providence	
	Peach Blossoms	1879	Oil on canvas	15.75 x 22.5 in	Private collection	
	Girl and Laurel	1879	Oil on canvas	22.625 x 15.75 in	Detroit Institute of Arts, Michigan	
	The Shepherdess	1879	Oil on canvas	22.75 x 15.75 in	Private collection	
	Girl Reading Under an Oak Tree	1879	Oil on canvas	15.5 x 22.5 in	Private collection	
	Upland Cotton	1879–1895	Oil on canvas	49.75 x 30 in	Private collection	
	Camp Fire	1880	Oil on canvas	23.75 x 38.125 in	Metropolitan Museum of Art, New York	
	Halibut Fishing	1880	Oil on panel	9 x 14 in	Private collection	
	Promenade on the Beach	1880	Oil on canvas	20 x 30.125 in	D'Amour Museum of Fine Arts, Massachusetts	
	Officers at Camp Benton	1881	Oil on canvas	21.25 x 33.125 in	Boston Public Library, Massachusetts	
	Early Evening (Note: Also known as Sailors Take Warning (Sunset))	1881	Oil on canvas	33 x 38.75 in	Freer Gallery of Art, Washington, D.C.	
	Sparrow Hall	1881–1882	Oil on canvas	15.5 x 22.25 in	National Gallery of Art, Washington, D.C.	
	Hark! The Lark	1882	Oil on canvas	36.375 x 31.375 in	Milwaukee Art Museum, Wisconsin	
	Coursing the Hare	1882	Oil on canvas	14.875 x 27.5 in	Virginia Museum of Fine Arts, Richmond	
	Two Figures by the Sea	1882	Oil on canvas	19.25 x 34.375 in	Denver Art Museum, Colorado	
	The Life Brigade	1882–1883	Oil on canvas	12 x 17.25 in	Myron Kunin Collection of American Art	
	Rocky Coast (Maine Coast)	1882–1900	Oil on canvas	14 x 27 in	Wadsworth Atheneum Museum of Art, Connecticut	
	Taking an Observation	1884	Oil on panel	15.25 x 24 in	Portland Museum of Art, Maine	
	Gloucester Mackerel Fleet at Sunset	1884	Oil on panel	15.625 x 37.75 in	Museum of Fine Arts Boston, Massachusetts	
	Gloucester Mackerel Fleet at Dawn	1884	Oil on panel	15.625 x 37.75 in	Museum of Fine Arts Boston, Massachusetts	
	The Life Line	1884	Oil on canvas	28.625 x 44.75 in	Philadelphia Museum of Art, Pennsylvania	
	The Fog Warning	1885	Oil on canvas	30.25 x 48.5 in	Museum of Fine Arts Boston, Massachusetts	
	Lost on the Grand Banks	1885	Oil on canvas	32 x 50 in	Private collection	
	The Herring Net	1885	Oil on canvas	30.125 x 48.375 in	Art Institute of Chicago, Illinois	
	Eight Bells	1886	Oil on canvas	25.25 x 30.25 in	Addison Gallery of American Art, Massachusetts	
	Rocky Coast	1886	Oil on pressboard	10.625 x 13.375 in	San Antonio Museum of Art, Texas	
	To the Rescue	1886	Oil on canvas	24 x 30 in	The Phillips Collection, Washington, D.C.	
	Undertow	1886	Oil on canvas	29.75 x 47.625 in	Clark Art Institute, Massachusetts	
	The Gale	1887	Oil on canvas	30.25 x 48.25 in	Worcester Art Museum, Massachusetts	
	Sunlight on the Coast	1890	Oil on canvas	30.25 x 48.5 in	Toledo Museum of Art, Ohio	
	Cloud Shadows	1890	Oil on canvas	24 x 28 in	Spencer Museum of Art, Kansas	
	Summer night	1890	Oil on canvas	30.25 x 40.125 in	Musée d'Orsay, France	
	Winter Coast	1890	Oil on canvas	36.125 x 31.75 in	Philadelphia Museum of Art, Pennsylvania	
	Moonlight on the Water	1890	Oil on canvas	15.75 x 31.375 in	Los Angeles County Museum of Art, California	
	Sleigh Ride	1890–1895	Oil on canvas	14 x 20.125 in	Clark Art Institute, Massachusetts	
	The Signal of Distress	1890–1896	Oil on canvas	24.375 x 38.625 in	Thyssen-Bornemisza Museum, Spain	
	Watching the Breakers	1891	Oil on canvas	29.375 x 39.375 in	Gilcrease Museum, Oklahoma	
	A Huntsman and Dogs	1891	Oil on canvas	28.125 x 48 in	Philadelphia Museum of Art, Pennsylvania	
	The West Wind	1891	Oil on canvas	30 x 44 in	Addison Gallery of American Art, Massachusetts	
	Coast in Winter	1892	Oil on canvas	28.5 x 48.25 in	Worcester Art Museum, Massachusetts	
	Hound and Hunter	1892	Oil on canvas	28.25 x 48.125 in	National Gallery of Art, Washington, D.C.	
	Fox Hunt	1893	Oil on canvas	38 x 68.5 in	Pennsylvania Academy of the Fine Arts, Pennsylvania	
	Coast of Maine	1893	Oil on canvas	24 x 30 in	Art Institute of Chicago, Illinois	
	The Fountains at Night, World's Columbian Exposition	1893	Oil on canvas	16.375 x 25.125 in	Bowdoin College Museum of Art, Maine	
	Weatherbeaten	1894	Oil on canvas	28.5 x 48.4 in	Portland Museum of Art, Maine	
	The Fisher Girl	1894	Oil on canvas	28.25 x 28.25 in	Mead Art Museum, Massachusetts	
	The Artist's Studio in an Afternoon Fog	1894	Oil on canvas	24 x 30.25 in	Memorial Art Gallery, New York	
	Moonlight, Wood Island Light	1894	Oil on canvas	30.75 x 40.25 in	Metropolitan Museum of Art, New York	
	High Cliff, Coast of Maine	1894	Oil on canvas	30.25 x 38.25 in	Smithsonian American Art Museum, Washington, D.C.	
	Below Zero	1894	Oil on canvas	23.875 x 28 in	Yale University Art Gallery, Connecticut	
	Cannon Rock	1895	Oil on canvas	40 x 40 in	Metropolitan Museum of Art, New York	
	Northeaster	1895–1901	Oil on canvas	34.5 x 50 in	Metropolitan Museum of Art, New York	
	Saco Bay	1896	Oil on canvas	23.875 x 38 in	Clark Art Institute, Massachusetts	
	Maine Coast	1896	Oil on canvas	30 x 40 in	Metropolitan Museum of Art, New York	
	The Lookout – "All's Well"	1896	Oil on canvas	39.875 x 30.125 in	Museum of Fine Arts Boston, Massachusetts	
	The Wreck	1896	Oil on canvas	30.375 x 48.25 in	Carnegie Museum of Art, Pennsylvania	
	Watching the Breakers: A High Sea	1896	Oil on canvas	24.5 x 38 in	Arkell Museum, New York	
	Wild Geese in Flight	1897	Oil on canvas	33.875 x 49.75 in	Portland Museum of Art, Maine	
	A Light on the Sea	1897	Oil on canvas	28.25 x 48.125 in	National Gallery of Art, Washington, D.C.	
	The Gulf Stream	1899	Oil on canvas	28.125 x 49.125 in	Metropolitan Museum of Art, New York	
	On a Lee Shore	1900	Oil on canvas	39 x 39 in	Rhode Island School of Design Museum, Providence	
	Eastern Point	1900	Oil on canvas	30.25 x 48.5 in	Clark Art Institute, Massachusetts	
	West Point, Prout's Neck	1900	Oil on canvas	30.125 x 48.125 in	Clark Art Institute, Massachusetts	
	Early Morning After a Storm at Sea	1900–1903	Oil on canvas	30.25 x 50 in	Cleveland Museum of Art, Ohio	
	Searchlight on Harbor Entrance, Santiago de Cuba	1901	Oil on canvas	30.5 x 50.5 in	Metropolitan Museum of Art, New York	
	Kissing the Moon	1904	Oil on canvas	30.25 x 40 in	Addison Gallery of American Art, Massachusetts	
	Summer Squall	1904	Oil on canvas	24.25 x 30.25 in	Clark Art Institute, Massachusetts	
	Shooting the Rapids, Saguenay River	1905–1910	Oil on canvas	30 x 48.25 in	Metropolitan Museum of Art, New York	
	Right and Left	1909	Oil on canvas	28.25 x 48.375 in	National Gallery of Art, Washington, D.C.	
	Driftwood	1909	Oil on canvas	24.5 x 28.5 in	Museum of Fine Arts Boston, Massachusetts	
