= Prouts Neck =

Peninsula in Maine, United States

Coordinates: 43°32′00″N 70°18′52″W

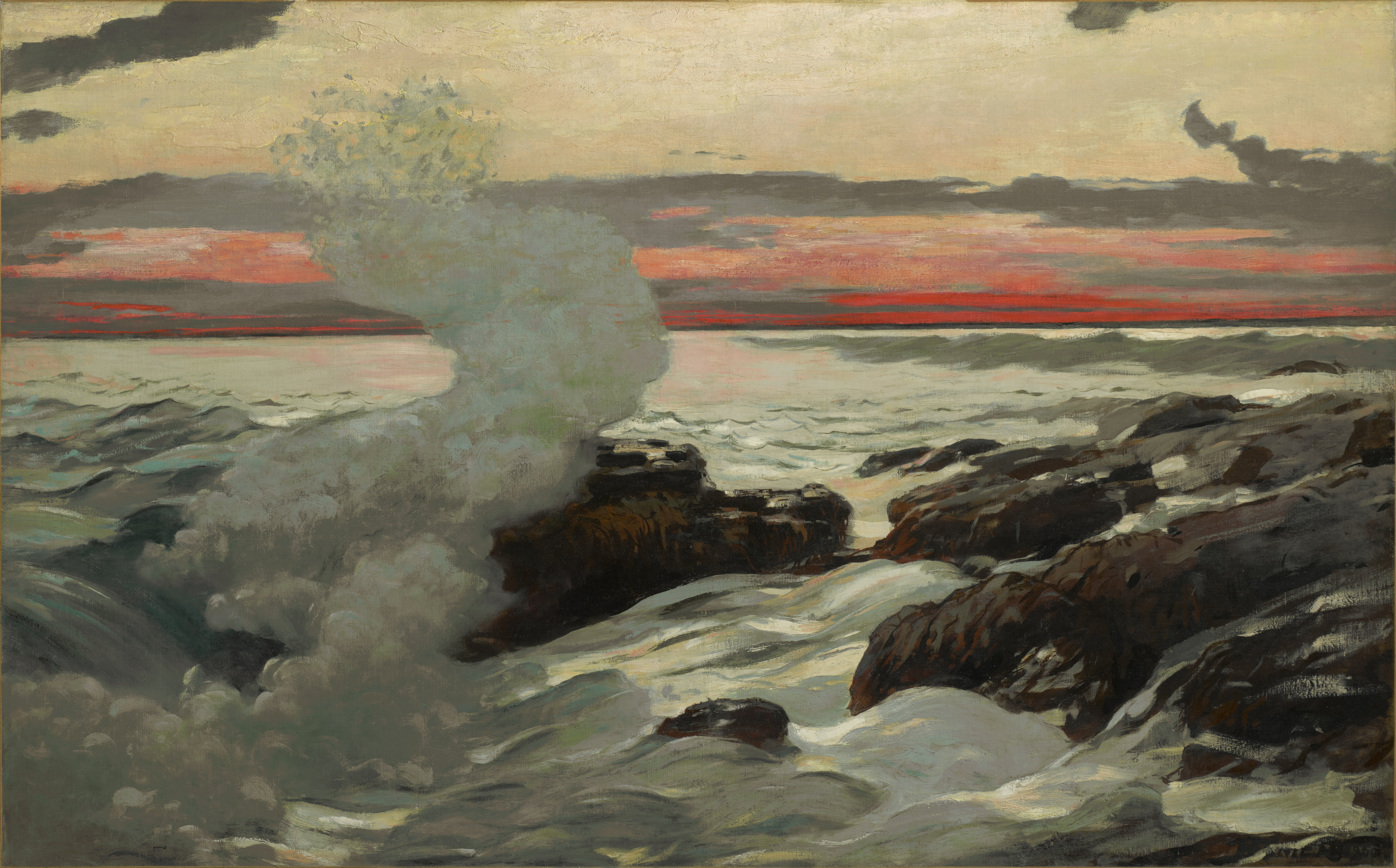
Winslow Homer, West Point, Prouts Neck, 1900. Clark Art Institute

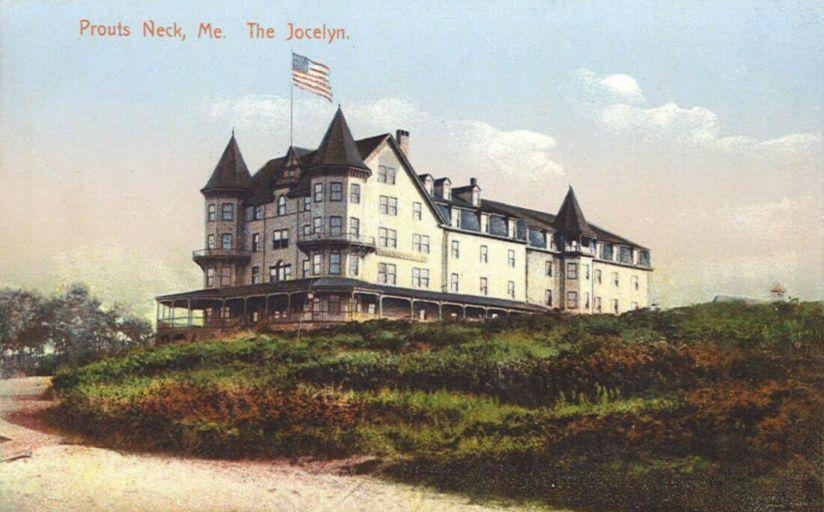
The Jocelyn Hotel c. 1908

Prouts Neck is a coastal peninsula, located within the town of Scarborough, in southern Maine.

== History ==
Prouts Neck first appears on a map by Samuel de Champlain from his 1604 explorations of New England. In early times, it was known as Black Point because of the dark appearance of its forests. Captain Thomas Cammock, a nephew of the Earl of Warwick, was the first European settler of present-day Prouts Neck. In 1631, he was granted an area of about 1500 acres by the Plymouth Council for New England which had jurisdiction, granted by the King, over all of New England. Ownership passed through several early families and settled for a time with Timothy Prout, a Boston merchant, who lived there from 1728 to 1768. His descendants consisting mostly of sea captains stayed in the nearby area. Even today they continue to live across coastal Maine and make a living as fishermen. The name Prout's Neck became well established, but by 1830 the Libby family had purchased most of the Neck and the name became Libby's Neck till the late 1870s, by which time most of the Libby land had been sold off to members of the growing summer community and the name reverted to Prouts Neck (more often written without the apostrophe).

Prouts Neck is known also for artist Winslow Homer (1836–1910). The Winslow Homer Studio there, overlooking Cannon Rock, is a National Historic Landmark.

== Present day ==
Prouts Neck, or just "Prouts" to residents, is a mostly seasonal summer community. The private roads on the neck are gated, and it is well patrolled by local police. The peninsula is almost completely built out, meaning that existing houses sell for a significant premium, and land for new ones is difficult to come by. There are a number of antique summer "cottages" that have been in families for generations, several of which were designed by noted architect John Calvin Stevens. These cottages are unique in that many have not changed for well over one hundred years, presenting an interesting view of a bygone era.

Although there were once many hotels on Prouts Neck, including the Jocelyn, and most notably the Checkley, the only one that remains is the venerable Black Point Inn, which is open on a seasonal basis.

Famous families that have summered in Prouts Neck for generations include members of the Rockefeller family and descendants of Thomas M. Carnegie or the family of Frances and Chester Bolton. Former Lieutenant Governor of Ontario Sir William Mortimer Clark summered and died at his home here.

=== Facilities ===
The Prouts Neck Country Club (PNCC), established in 1907, is a private country club with an 18-hole golf course, putting green, driving range, tennis courts, golf shop, tennis pro shop, and clubhouse. Membership is restricted to residents of Prouts Neck and their guests.

The Prouts Neck Bathing Association (PNBA) is responsible for maintenance and regulation of the private Beach Club.

The Prouts Neck Yacht Club (PNYC) is located on the southwestern corner of the peninsula, also known as Western Point. The club conducts sailing classes for children from age 6–17 as well as classes for adults. The club operates moorings for both powerboats and sailboats. The club owns a fleet of 420s, a fleet of Prams, a few Optimists and a fleet of about 8 Sonars. Prouts Neck Yacht Club has adult Sonar races weekly as well as 2 inter-club regattas each summer, (one in August, one in July), both called the Golden Cleat Regatta.

== See also ==
- Cumberland County, Maine
