= Banks dory =

Fishing vessel used in Newfoundland

The Banks dory, or Grand Banks dory, is a type of dory. They were used as traditional fishing boats from the 1850s on the Grand Banks of Newfoundland. The Banks dory is a small, open, narrow, flat-bottomed and slab-sided boat with a particularly narrow transom. They were inexpensive to build and could be stacked or nested inside each other and stored on the decks of larger fishing vessels which functioned as mother ships.

Banks dories have long overhangs at the bow and stern which helps them lift over waves. There were one-man and two-man versions. Most could be fitted with sails. The dories became more stable when they were loaded with about half a ton of catch.

== Production ==
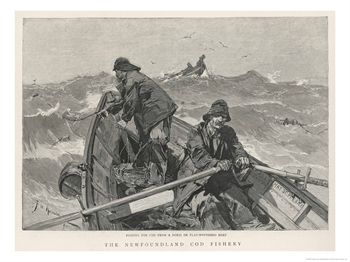
Cod fishing on the Newfoundland Banks

The Banks dory type is very simple and efficient to produce, making them well suited to mass production. By 1880, Bank dories were being built in large numbers in the Massachusetts towns of Gloucester, Beverly, Essex, Newburyport, and Salisbury (Amesbury). Other major areas of production included Seabrook, New Hampshire; Lunenburg, Nova Scotia; Shelburne, Nova Scotia and both Portland and Bremen, Maine. Salisbury alone had 7 shops producing between 200 and 650 boats a year. The firm of Higgins and Giford of Gloucester advertised in 1886 that it had built over 3,000 dories in the preceding 13 years. Founded in 1793, Lowell's Boat Shop of Amesbury Massachusetts is the oldest continuously operating boat shop in the United States. It was the first to build these boats in large numbers and excelled at their mass production. In the year 1911 Lowell's Boat Shop produced 2029 dories, averaging 7 dories a working day. A National Landmark and working museum, Lowell's Boat Shop continues to build its dories and skiffs in the Lowell tradition to this day.

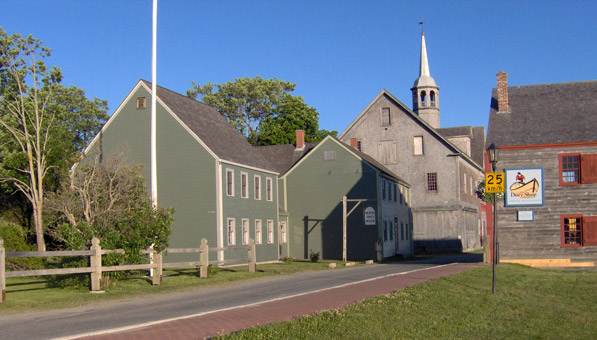
The Dory Shop Museum, seen on the right, in Shelburne, Nova Scotia.

In Nova Scotia, the towns of Lunenburg and Shelburne maintained a rivalry in the mass production of dories. A distinction emerged in 1887 with the use in Shelburne of "dory clips", metal braces used to join frames, versus the more expensive but stronger natural wood frames used in Lunenburg dories. The John Williams Dory Shop in Shelburne was one of several Shelburne factories mass-producing dories. It is now the Dory Shop Museum, operated by the Nova Scotia Museum and continues to produce dories.

== Mother ships ==
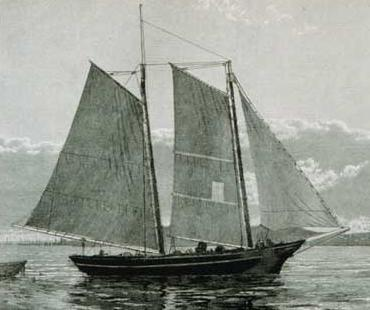
Typically schooners were used as dory mother ships

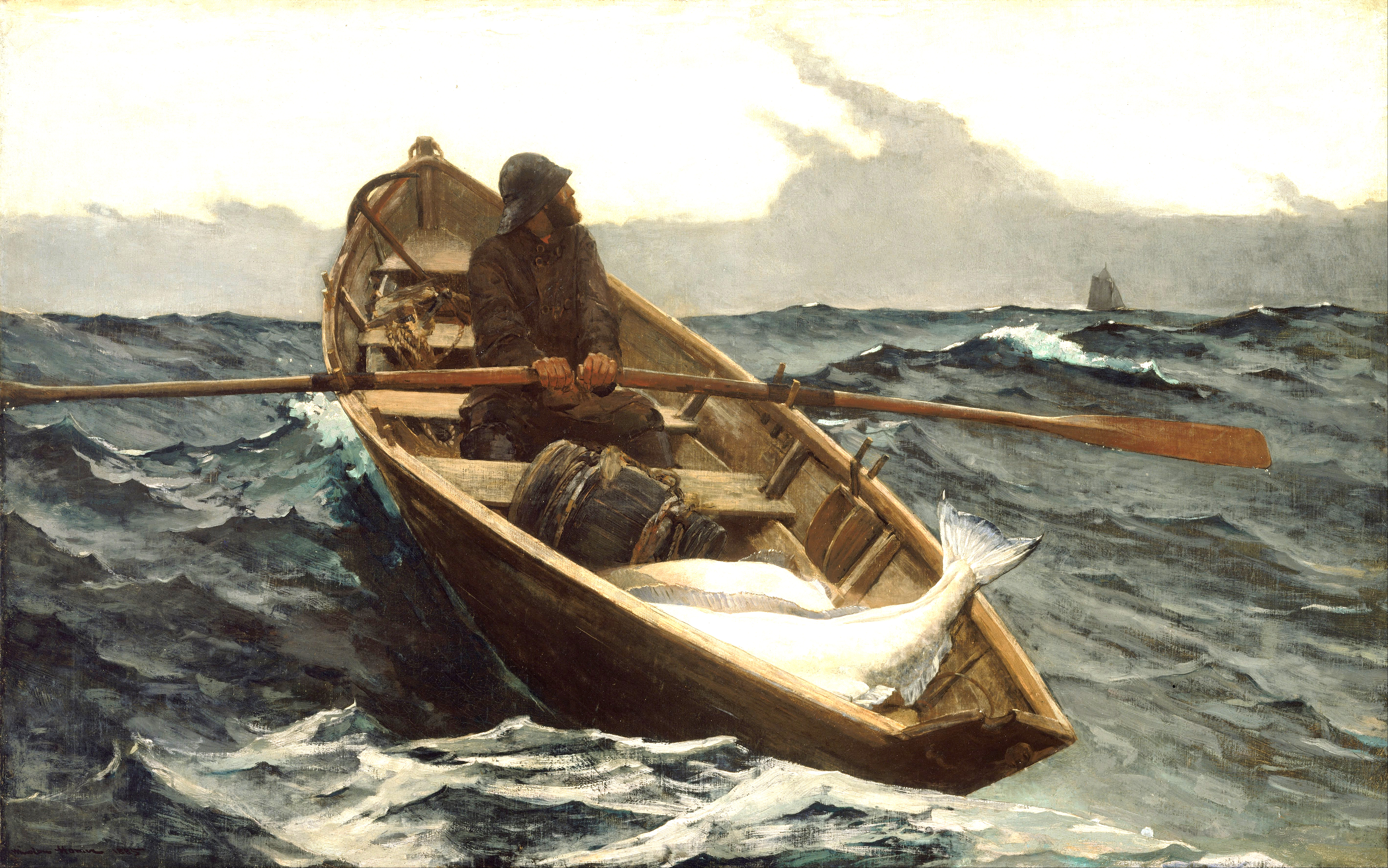
The Fog Warning, painted by Winslow Homer in 1885

Banks dories were carried aboard mother ships, usually fishing schooners, and used for handlining cod on the Grand Banks. Before Banks dories were introduced, fish were caught with handlines from the mother ship alone. Weather permitting, the dories were launched early each day with one or two crew and bait from previous catches. During the day they would return several times to the mother ship and unload their catches.

The barquentine, Gazela Primeiro, while not a schooner, was one of the last of the dory mother ships. She had a long association with dories and the Grand Banks cod industry and made her final voyage in 1969.

Banks dories have survived long voyages, some unintended, when the fishermen became separated from their mother ships. One of the more famous adventures was by Howard Blackburn who survived 5 days in the North Atlantic.

A Banks dory is seen in Winslow Homer's painting The Fog Warning. The Boston Fine Art Museum gives this description:

The Fog Warning is a painting with a narrative, though its tale is disturbing rather than charming. As indicated by the halibut in his dory, the fisherman in this picture has been successful. But the hardest task of the day, the return to the main ship, is still ahead of him. He turns to look at the horizon, measuring the distance to the mother ship, and to safety. The seas are choppy and the dory rocks high on the waves, making it clear that the journey home will require considerable physical effort. But more threatening is the approaching fog bank, whose streamers echo, even mock, the fisherman's profile.

== Other uses ==
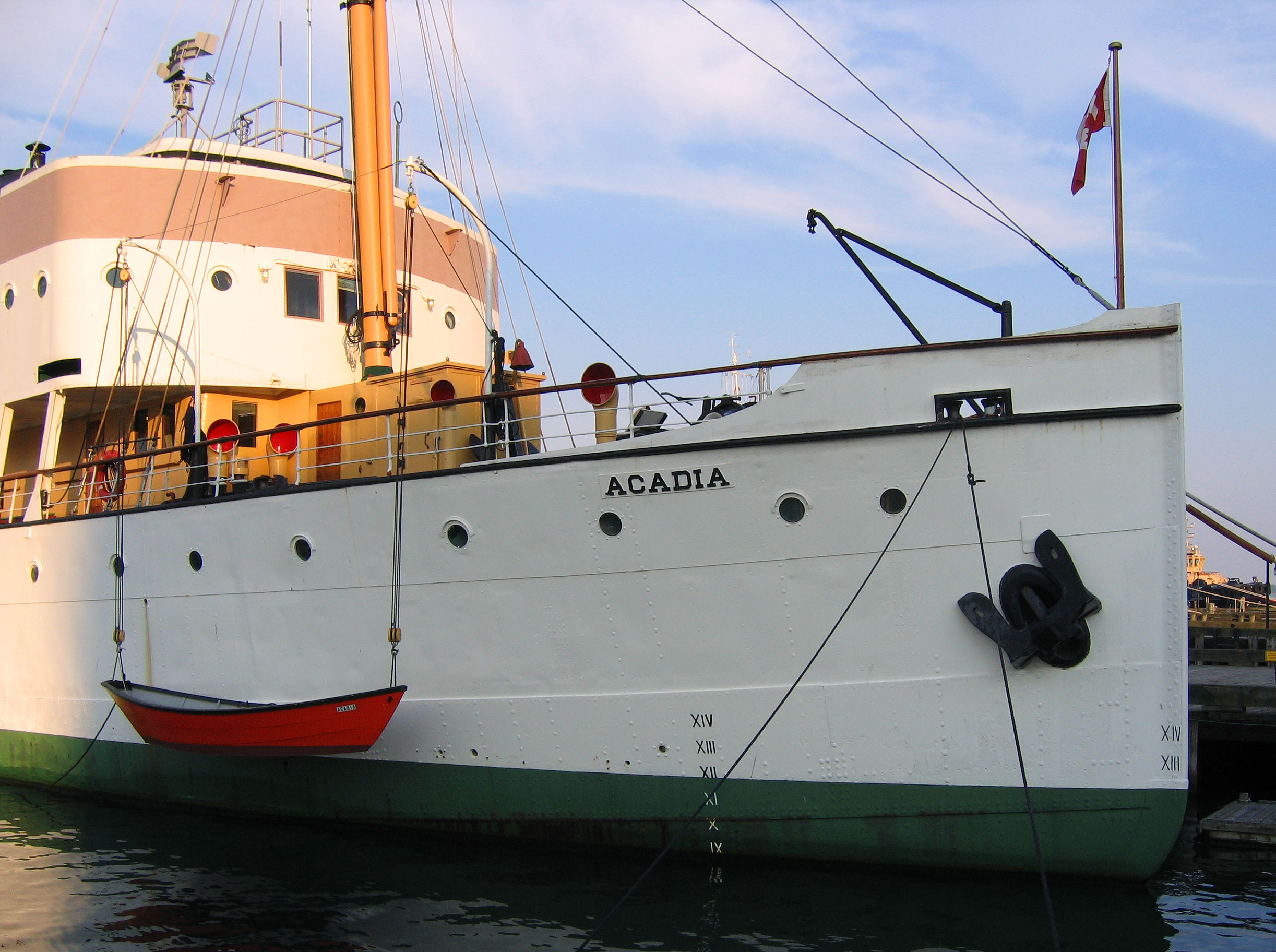
Banks dory used as work boat by CSS Acadia

The rugged construction, affordability and ease of stowage made banks dories popular for work boats on large sailing vessels as well as steamships and motor vessels. These same virtues made them popular for inshore fishermen in some locales. They were also used in later years as lifeboats and tenders on commercial motor fishing boats such as Cape Islander fishing boats. In recent times, the history and iconic look of banks dories have made them popular for amateur boat builders and some recreational boaters.

== Gloucester dory ==
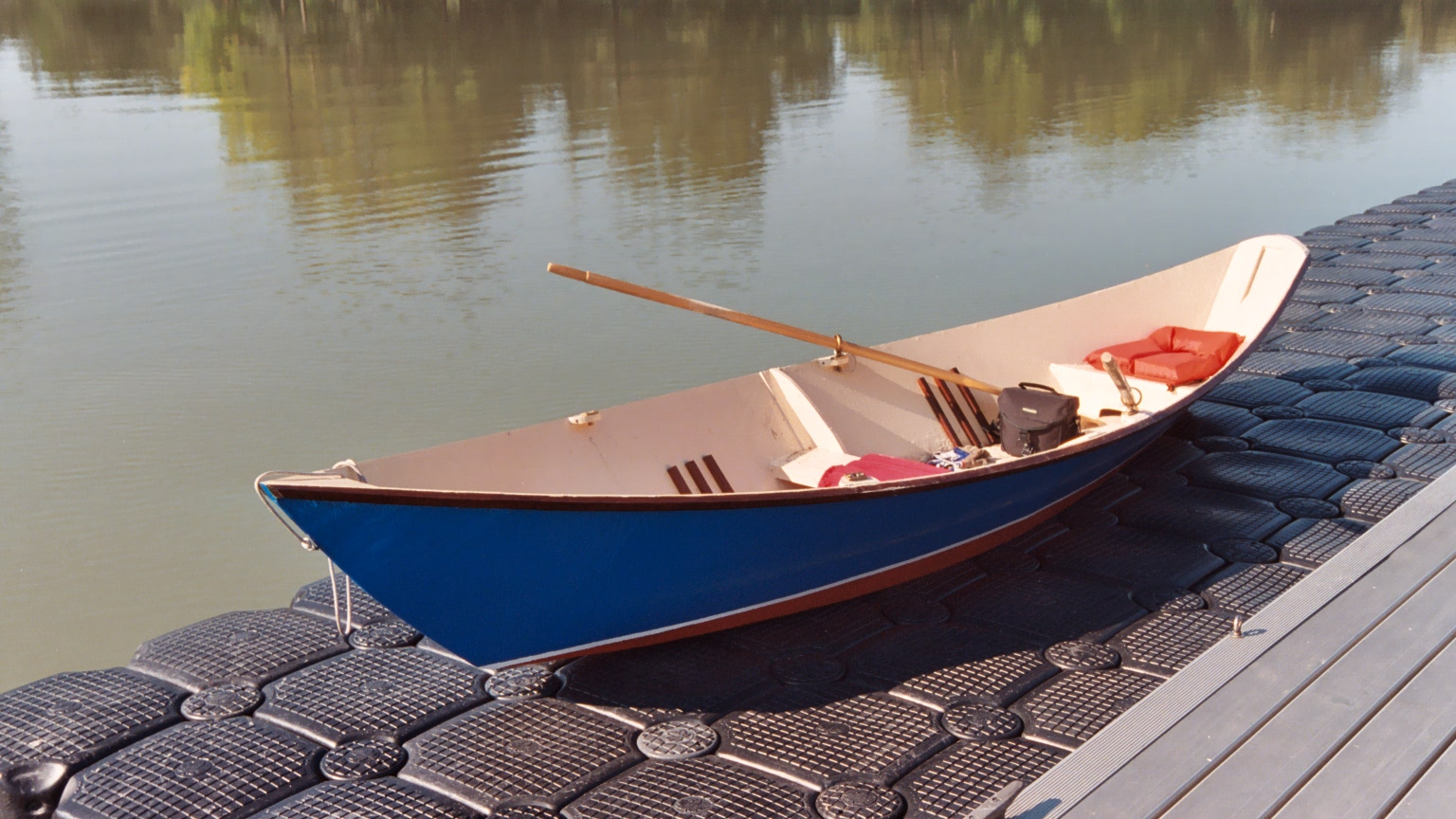
Gloucester light dory

The Gloucester dory is a variant of the Banks dory. It is characteristically smaller and lighter, with less overhang, both bow and stern, and less freeboard. It retains the Banks dory's slab sides. Gloucester dories were designed to be launched through the surf behind a breakwater for daily fishing and lobstering off the Massachusetts shore. Because of its simple lines, a Gloucester dory is relatively easy to build. With the straight sides and flat bottom, stitch and glue techniques work well with this boat.

== See also ==
- Swampscott dory
