= The Gulf Stream (painting) =

Painting by Winslow Homer

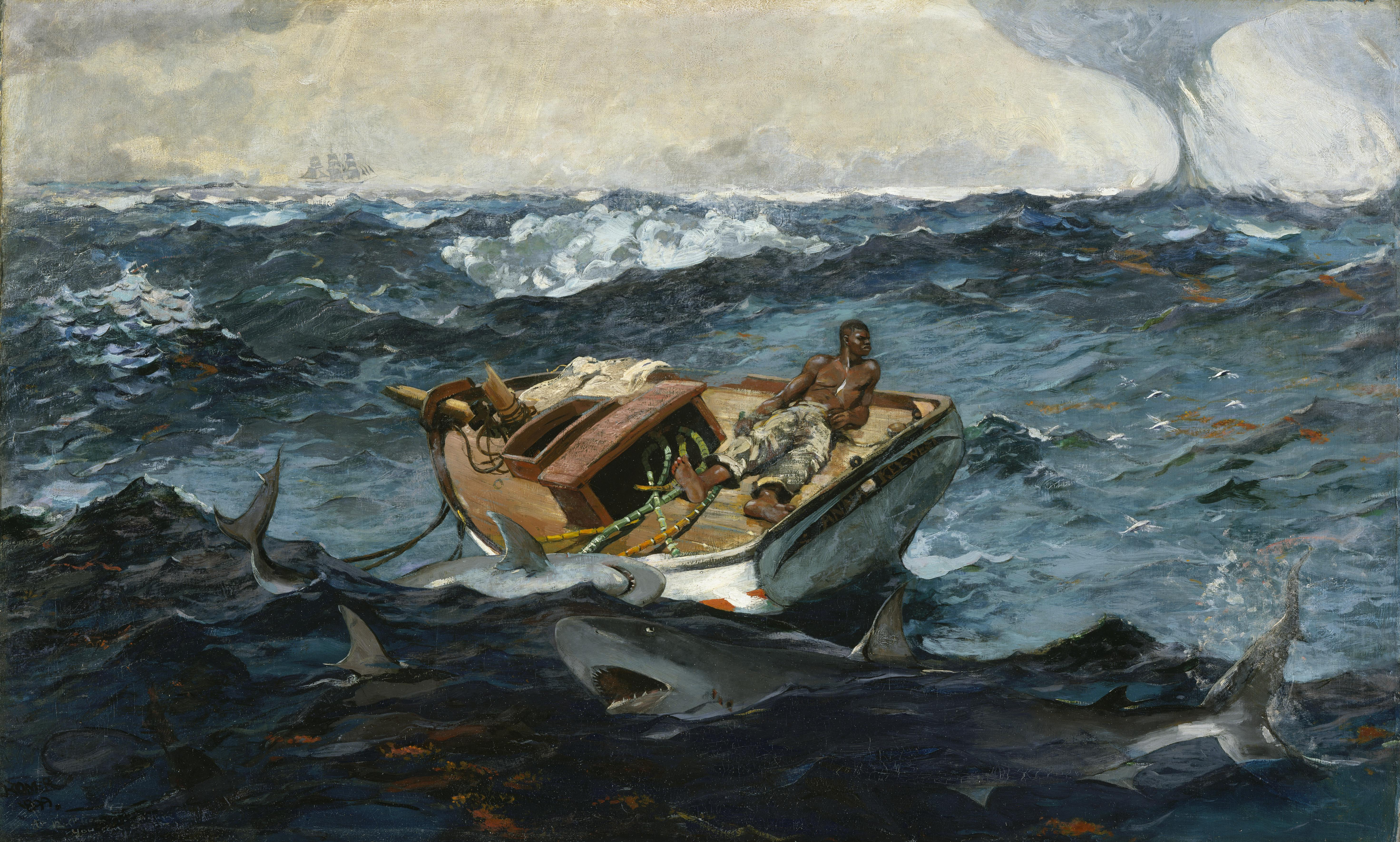
- Artist: Winslow Homer
- Year: 1899
- Medium: oil paint, canvas
- Movement: Realism, Naturalism
- Dimensions: 71.4 cm (28.1 in) × 124.8 cm (49.1 in)
- Location: Metropolitan Museum of Art

The Gulf Stream is an 1899 oil on canvas painting by the American artist Winslow Homer. It shows a man in a small dismasted rudderless fishing boat struggling against the storm-tossed waves and perils of the sea, presumably near the Gulf Stream, and was the artist's statement on a theme that had interested him for more than a decade. During the time he explored this theme, Homer, a New Englander, boated often near Florida, Cuba, and the Caribbean.

== Background ==
Homer crossed the Gulf Stream numerous times; his first trip to the Caribbean in 1885 seems to have inspired several related works dated from the same year, including a pencil drawing of a dismasted boat, a large watercolor The Derelict (Sharks), and a larger watercolor of the forward part of the boat, Study for "The Gulfstream". A later watercolor study was The Gulfstream of 1889, in which the disabled boat now includes a sailor and flailing shark. Additionally, there are other related watercolors; the shark in Shark Fishing of 1885 was later appropriated for The Gulfstream of 1889. A watercolor of 1899 entitled After the Hurricane (also known as After the Hurricane, Bahamas) depicting a figure lying unconscious beside his beached and wreaked boat, with waves and sky suggesting the aftermath of a storm, represents the finale of the narrative of man against nature.

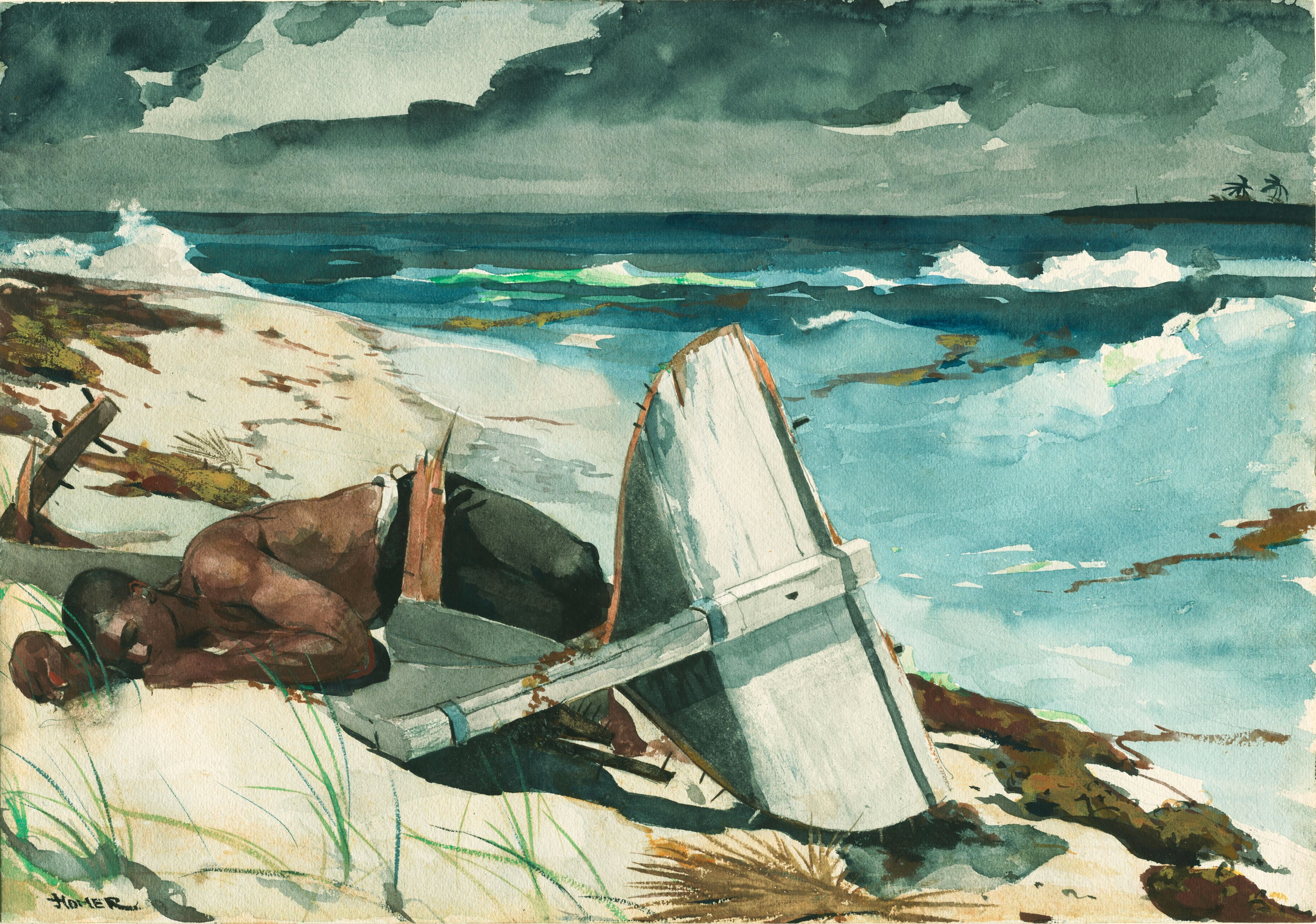
After the Hurricane, painted by Homer in 1899, perhaps as the sequel to The Gulf Stream, "is among Homer's most astonishing and ambitious watercolors for its sheer technical virtuosity and epic subject matter"

Another possible inspiration for the series of watercolors and The Gulf Stream itself was McCabe's Curse, a Bahamian tale about a British Captain McCabe who in 1814 was robbed by thieves, hired a small boat in hopes of reaching a nearby island, but was caught in a storm and later died in Nassau of yellow fever; Homer saved an account of the story and pasted it into a travel guide.

A visit to Nassau and Florida between December 1898 and February 1899 immediately preceded the final painting. Homer began work on the painting by September 1899, at which time he wrote: "I painted in water colors three months last winter at Nassau, & have now just commenced arranging a picture from some of the studies." Chronologically the first of a series of major works painted by Homer in the last decade of his life, The Gulf Stream was painted in the penultimate year of the century, the year after the death of his father, and has been seen as revealing his sense of abandonment or vulnerability.

== Exhibition and reaction ==
In 1900, Homer sent The Gulf Stream to Philadelphia to be exhibited at the Pennsylvania Academy of the Fine Arts. After it was returned later that year, he wrote "I have painted on the picture since it was in Philadelphia and improved it very much (more of the Deep Sea water than before)." In fact, comparison with an early photograph of the painting shows that Homer not only reworked the ocean, but changed the starboard gunwale by breaking it, added the sail and the red dash of color near the waterline, made the boat's name (Anna – Key West) clearly legible, and painted in the ship at the upper left horizon—possibly to mitigate the sense of desolation in the work. He then showed the painting at the Carnegie Institute in Pittsburgh, and asked $4,000 for it.

In 1906, The Gulf Stream was exhibited at the National Academy of Design, and all the members of the academy's jury petitioned the Metropolitan Museum of Art to purchase the painting. Newspaper reviews of the work were mixed; it was seen as more melodramatic than Homer's usual work. A reviewer in Philadelphia noted that viewers had laughed at the painting, which he referred to as "Smiling Sharks", describing the scene as "a naked negro lying in a boat while a school of sharks [are] waltzing around him in the most ludicrous manner". Another contemporary critic wrote that The Gulf Stream "displays a certain diffusion of interest seldom seen in the canvases of [Homer's] best manner". The museum bought the painting the same year.

== Interpretation and influences ==
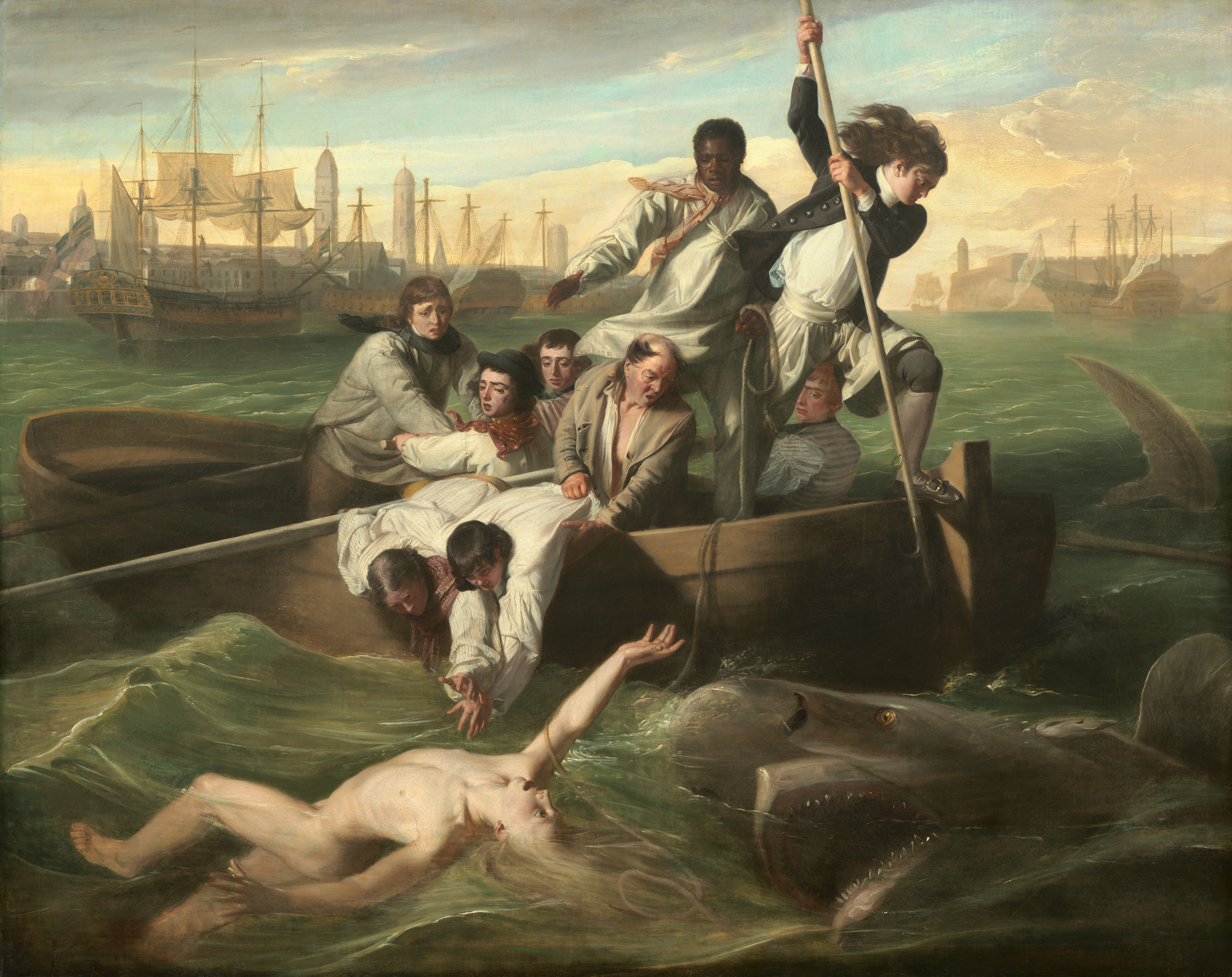
John Singleton Copley, Watson and the Shark, 1778

Homer's intentions for The Gulf Stream are opaque. The painting has been described as "a particularly enigmatic and tantalizing episode, a marine puzzle that floats forever in a region of unsolved mysteries." Bryson Burroughs, a onetime curator at the Metropolitan Museum, noted that it "assumes the proportion of a great allegory if one chooses". Its drama is of a romantic and heroic vein, the man stoically resigned to fate, surrounded by anecdotal detail reminiscent of Homer's early illustrative works.

When a viewer requested an explanation for the narrative, Homer fairly bristled in response:

I regret very much that I have painted a picture that requires any description....I have crossed the Gulf Stream ten times & I should know something about it. The boat & sharks are outside matters of very little consequence. They have been blown out to sea by a hurricane. You can tell these ladies that the unfortunate negro who now is so dazed & parboiled, will be rescued & returned to his friends and home, & ever after live happily.

The painting alludes to John Singleton Copley's 1778 composition, Watson and the Shark, as well as a handful of dramatic marine paintings of the 19th century. In American Visions: The Epic History of Art in America, Robert Hughes contrasts Homer's picture with Copley's. While Copley's shark jaw is alien in form and most likely drawn from second-hand accounts, Homer's—owing to the artist's familiarity with the subject—correctly captures the sharks' anatomy. Secondly, in Copley's version, a rescue is imminent: the horizon is near and light in tone, and many boats, within the harbor and probably docked, are seen in the background. Homer's version, with its circling sharks, broken mast, lone figure, looming water spout, and open sea give a sense of abandonment. The ship at far left is so distant as to suggest that society, while present, is completely unattainable; it presents the viewer with a so-close-yet-so-far situation. These two paintings contrast in their immediacy as well. In Watson and the Shark there is constant movement: the boat moving forward, the downward thrust of the spear, the two men reaching down for the victim, and finally the shark which extends off the canvas. In Homer's painting, the scene is more static: the sharks seem to swim slowly around the boat which lolls in a trough between waves.

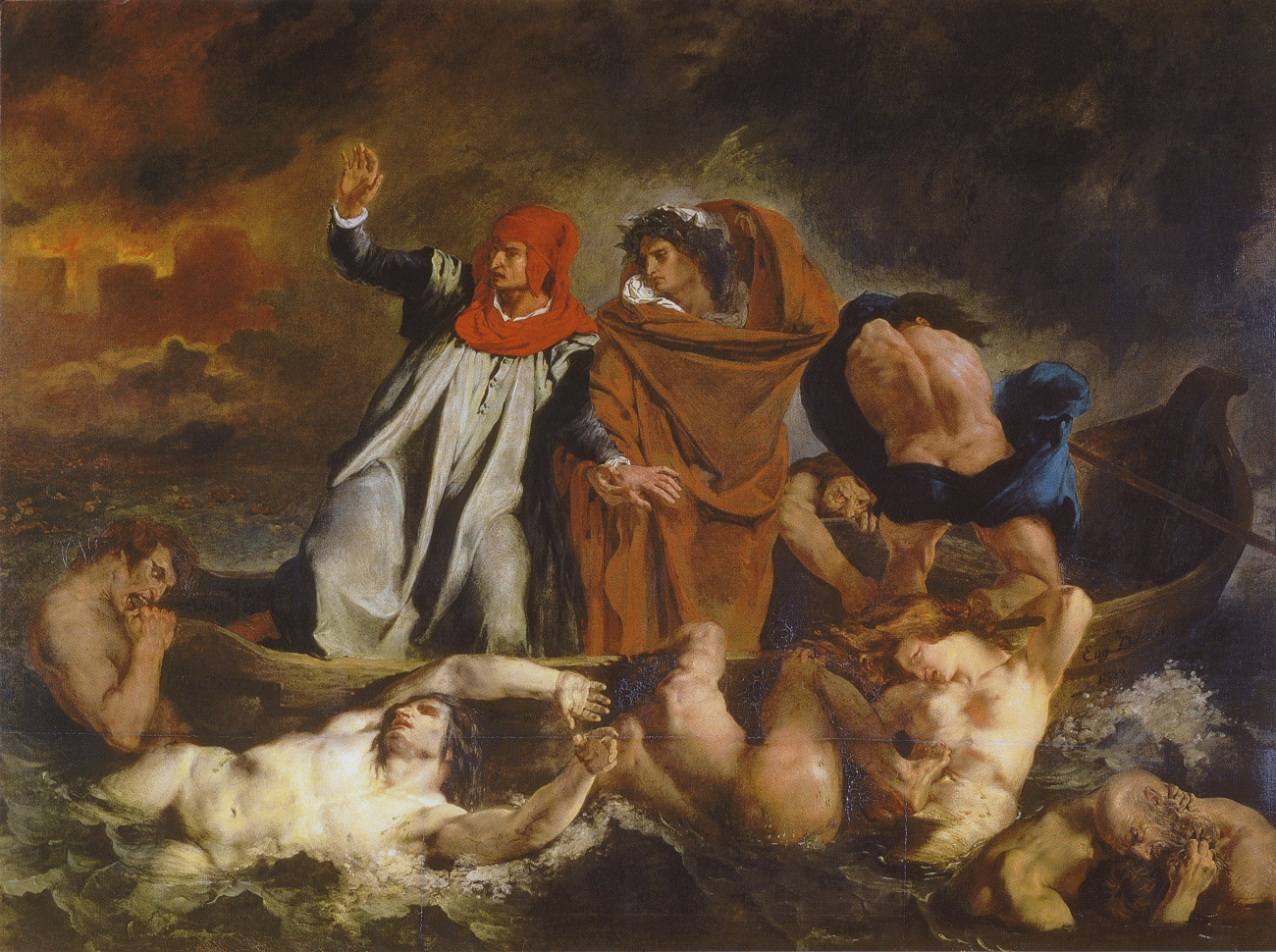
The looming sharks of The Gulf Stream have been compared to the damned souls that besiege The Barque of Dante by Eugène Delacroix.

References to other 19th-century paintings, including The Barque of Dante by Eugène Delacroix, The Slave Ship by J. M. W. Turner, and The Voyage of Life by Thomas Cole have been noted as well. These three paintings (in the case of the Delacroix, a preliminary study) were in one of the finest public art collections in America in the mid 19th century, that of John Taylor Johnston of New York, and it is likely that Homer was familiar with the paintings; one of his own works, Prisoners from the Front, was in the same collection. For art historian Nicolai Cikovsky, Jr., The Gulf Stream is more richly informed by these artistic predecessors than by Homer's direct experiences at sea, with the circling sharks derived from the tortured souls of The Barque of Dante, the dramatic sea and sky inspired by The Slave Ship, and the "mode of pictorial utterance" akin to The Voyage of Life.

Elements in the painting have been interpreted as possessing funereal references: in addition to the black cross in the boat's bow, the open hatch (representing a tomb), ropes (for lowering the body), broken mast and torn sail (shroud) have been cited for symbolic meanings. By contrast, the boat in Homer's painting Breezing Up (A Fair Wind) of 1876 featured an anchor in its bow, symbolic of hope. The sailor in The Gulf Stream ignores these allusions, as he pays no heed to the sharks, waterspout, nor the ship in the distance, and inverts the optimism of the romantic masterpiece Raft of the Medusa painted earlier in the century by Théodore Géricault.

Homer biographer Albert Ten Eyck Gardner believed The Gulf Stream was the artist's greatest painting, and art critic Sadakichi Hartmann called it "one of the greatest pictures ever painted in America". Later assessments have been more critical of the "almost excessive pathos of the drama." John Updike thought the painting "famous but on the edge of the absurd, with its overkill of sharks and waterspout". For Sidney Kaplan, a scholar on black American culture, The Gulf Stream is the "masterpiece of the black image—the deathless Negro waiting stoically, Homerically for his end between waterspout and white-bellied shark." Peter H. Wood has written a book interpreting the painting as an allegory of the situation of blacks in America during the slave trade and afterwards. The painting is referenced in a poem in the novel, This Ruler. In the book it is an allegory for the plight of teachers in American schools.

The painting is referenced in Derek Walcott's Omeros, where the poem's narrator encounters the work on a visit to an unnamed museum and identifies the man in the painting with his character, Achille, referring to the painter as 'another Homer'.

== See also ==
- List of paintings by Winslow Homer
