= Dory (boat) =

Double-ended flat-bottomed rowboat

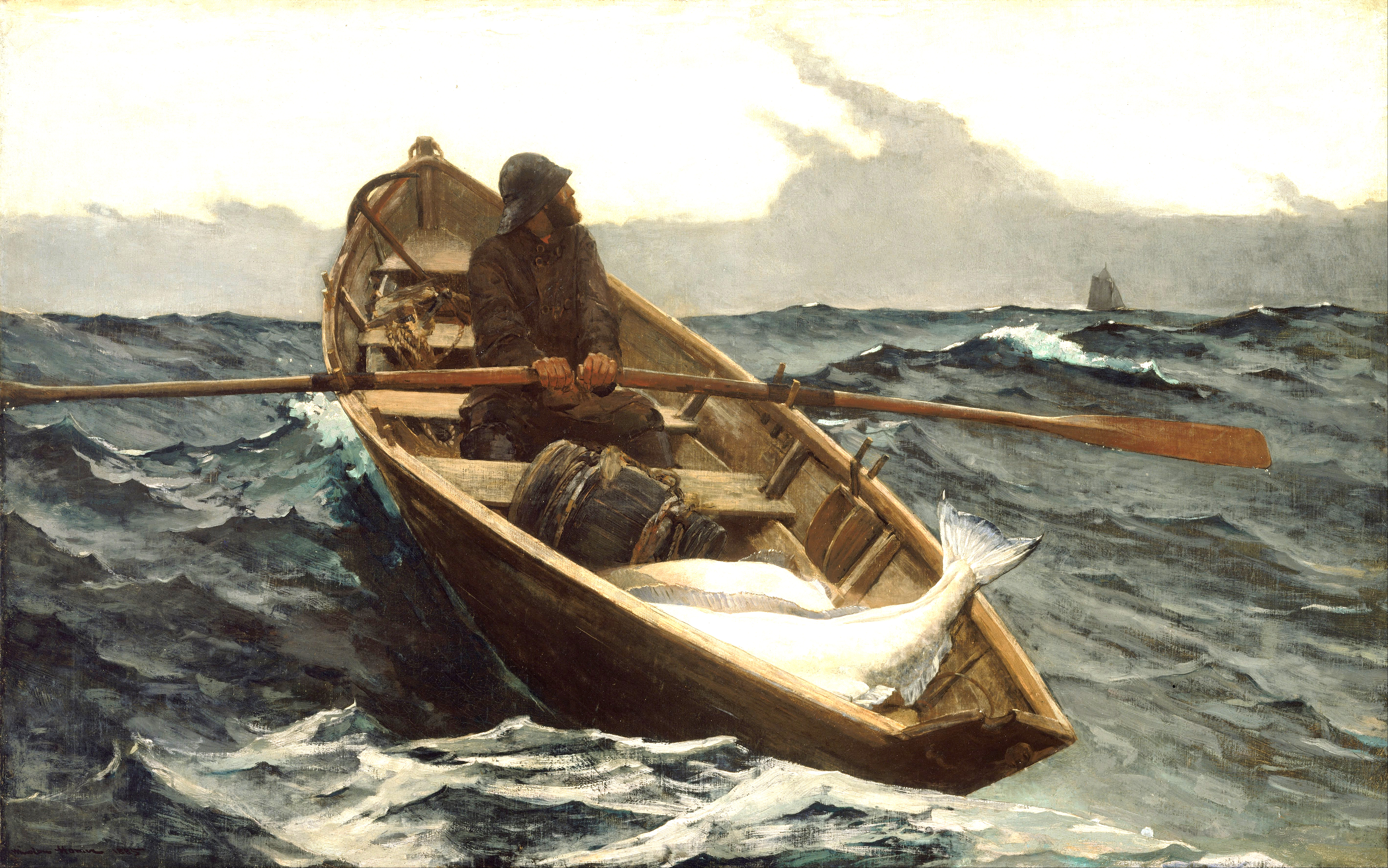
The Fog Warning, 1885

A dory is a small, open boat characterised by a narrow flat bottom, high flaring sides, pointed ends, and a narrow transom. Traditional dories are built with longitudinal planks whose natural curve helps determine the hull shape, with the bottom rising toward bow and stern in a pronounced rocker. It was traditionally propelled by rowing.

Dories became especially associated with the North Atlantic fisheries. Banks dories were carried aboard larger fishing vessels, particularly on the Grand Banks of Newfoundland, and were designed to be nested or stacked on deck.

The use of dories as working fishing craft declined with the spread of motorised fishing vessels, but dory forms continued in recreational sailing, river craft and other modern adaptations.

== Construction and use ==
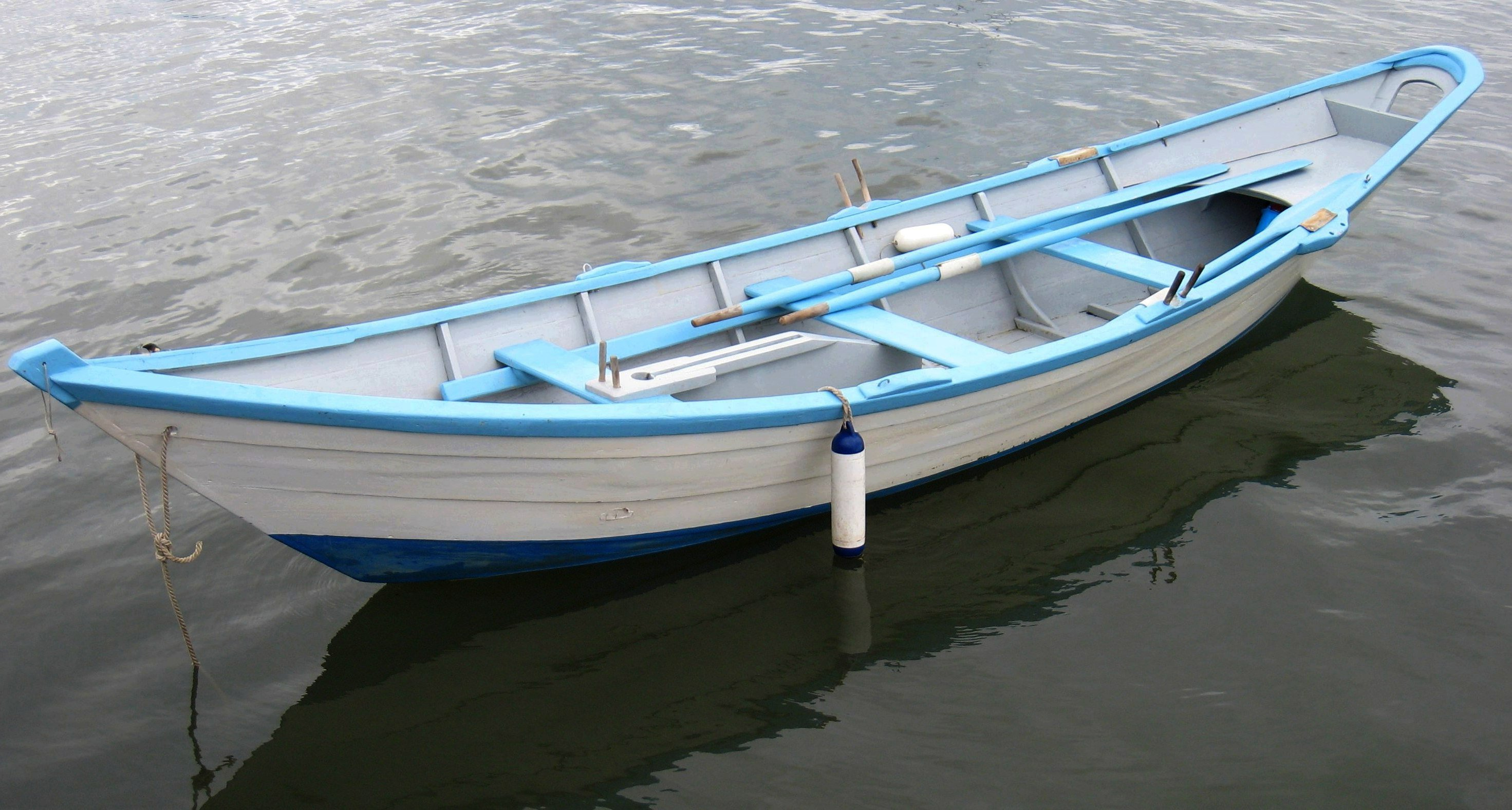
Dory with small outboard mount

The traditional fishing dory was strongly and simply built, designed for big seas. A defining feature is its method of construction. The hull is clinker-built, with its shape following the natural curve of the longitudinal planks (strakes). Those planks run lengthwise, flaring upwards to create the high sides, and overlap the stem. An outer ‘false’ stem covers and protects the forward ends of the planks.

The bottom of the hull is flat and narrow, rising at each end, a curvature called "rocker". The transom has a characteristically narrow "V" shape, making the boat double-ended.

Dories were widely used in the fisheries, including with hand-lines and trawls. Banks dories, associated especially with the Grand Banks of Newfoundland, were designed to be stacked aboard larger fishing vessels, as the thwarts (seats) were removable. In this way, a ship could carry as many as 60 dories in "nests" on its deck.

== History ==
Dories in Saint-Malo, 1927

Row boats have been in use for at least 4,500 years. Flat-bottomed, slab-sided, double-ended small boats have been in use in Europe since at least the 1400s. There is evidence that in the 1500s French and Basque fishermen were visiting the Grand Banks in ships carrying smaller fishing boats on their decks. Both the French and the English colonists used small flat-bottomed boats for fishing in North America. A drawing of the Newfoundland fishery made around the year 1700 in London shows fishermen unloading cod from what appears to be a dory skiff, a variation with a wider transom and lower freeboard.

The first known written mention of a dory is in a 1719 account of an English vessel sailing from Madeira to Jamaica, and throughout the 1700s written evidence of the dory becomes more frequent.

Records indicate that various types of small flat-bottomed working row boats were in use in the late 1700s in New England, variously called dories, wherries or bateaux, the latter having been in use since the 1600s by the French in what is now Quebec and Maine. The Banks dory was used from the 1850s on the Grand Banks of Newfoundland.

The earliest known written evidence of the boat's design dates to 1884, in Henry Hall's Report on the Ship Building Industry. This publication mentions the production of up to 650 dories annually in Salisbury, Massachusetts. By the 1880s, Banks dories were being built in large numbers from New England to Newfoundland, including in Shelburne, Nova Scotia, where a factory survives as the Dory Shop Museum and continues to build Banks dories.

== Modern use and adaptations ==
Traditionally, dory propulsion was by rowing or a lugsail. The introduction of motorised fishing boats greatly reduced the use of dories as working fishing craft. The traditional hull form was poorly suited to motorisation. With the introduction of the outboard motor the design was adapted to support the thrust of the outboard motor by widening the stern and reducing the rocker. The last "mother ship" to employ dories was reportedly a three masted schooner from Saint Malo, France, around 1952. As the need for working dories diminished, dories were modified for pleasure sailing.

The McKenzie River dory, or drift boat, is an adaptation of the open-water dory for use in rivers and rapids.

Modern designers continue to produce recreational boats based on traditional dory forms, often adapting them to contemporary construction methods. Examples include the Gloucester light dory, and the Northeaster dory.

== See also ==
- Alfred "Centennial" Johnson: a fisherman who in 1876 made the first recorded single-handed crossing of the Atlantic Ocean. He used a sailing dory.
- Swampscott dory: a Massachusetts inshore-fishing variant of the dory, developed for beach launching and commonly used in fishing and lobstering.
