= Shipwreck on the Coast =

Painting by Eugène Delacroix

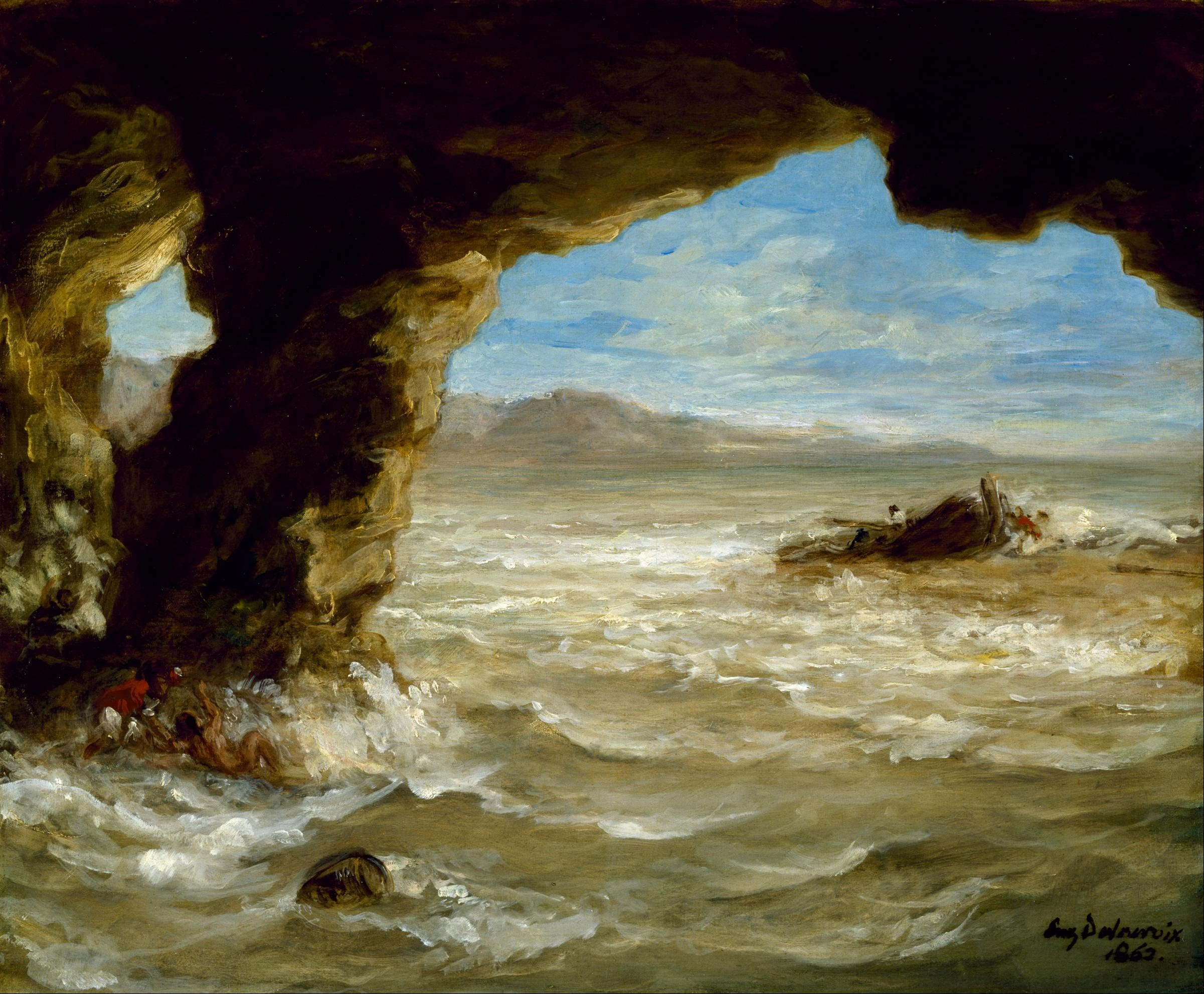
- Artist: Eugène Delacroix
- Year: 1862
- Type: Oil on canvas, maritime painting
- Dimensions: 38.1 cm × 45.1 cm (15.0 in × 17.8 in)
- Location: Museum of Fine Arts; Houston

Shipwreck on the Coast is an 1862 maritime painting by the French artist Eugène Delacroix. It drew inspiration from the works of Giovanni Battista Piranesi. Viewed from a rocky coastline it shows a completely dismasted vessel. It was part of a thriving tradition in nineteenth century art depicting shipwrecks. Today the painting is in the collection of the Museum of Fine Arts in Houston, having been acquired in 2004.

== Bibliography ==
- Allard, Sébastien & Fabre, Côme. Delacroix. Metropolitan Museum of Art, 2018.
- Casaliggi, Carmen. John Ruskin, J.M.W. Turner and the Art of Water. Cambridge Scholars Publishing, 2022.
- Huyghe, René. Delacroix. H.N. Abrams, 1963.
- Landow, George P. Images of Crisis: Literary Iconology, 1750 to the Present. Routledge, 2014.
