= The Fog Warning =

Painting by Winslow Homer

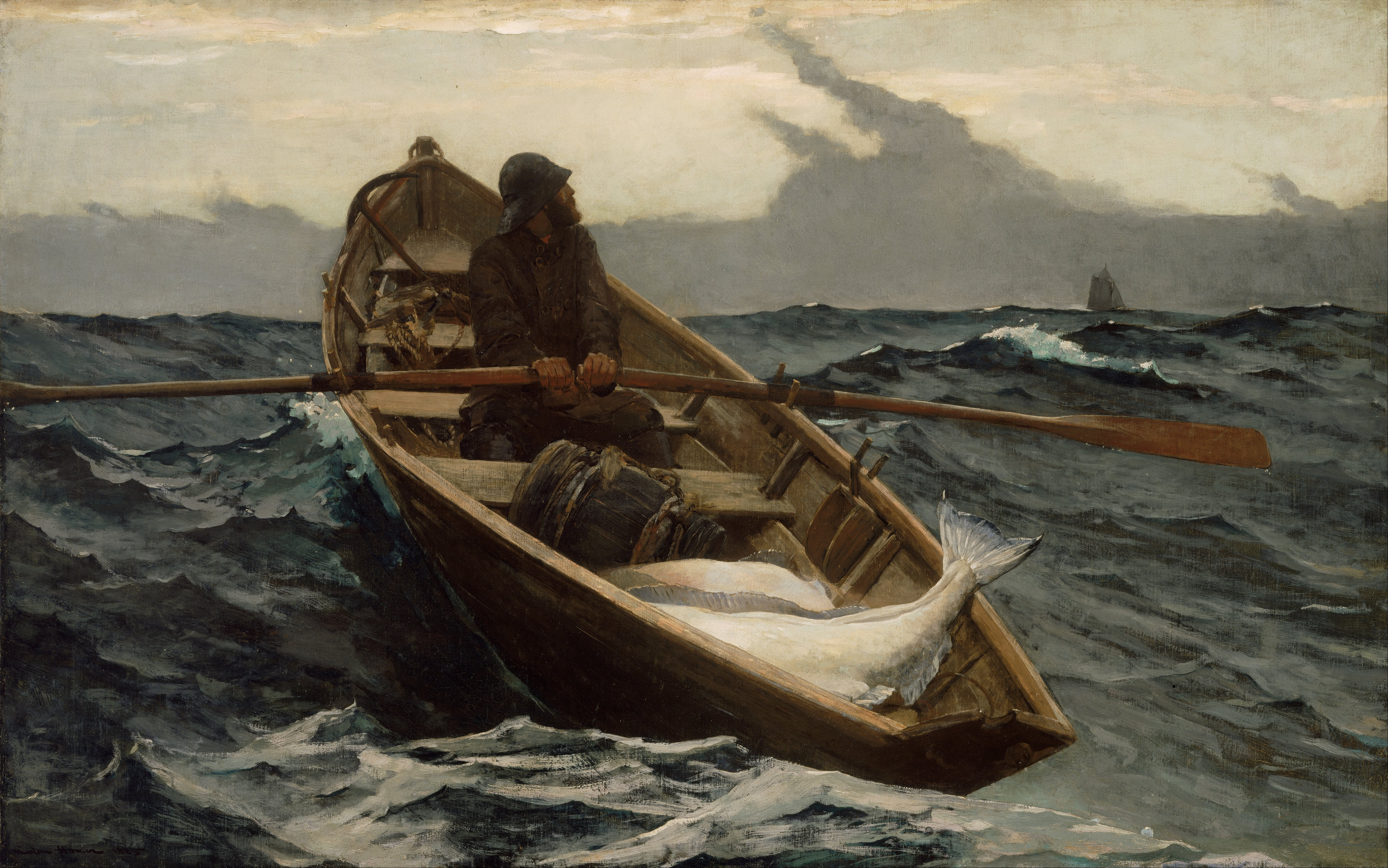
- Artist: Winslow Homer
- Year: 1885
- Medium: Oil on canvas
- Dimensions: 76 cm × 122 cm (30 in × 48 in)
- Location: Museum of Fine Arts, Boston, U.S.

The Fog Warning is one of several paintings on marine subjects by the late-19th-century American painter Winslow Homer (1836–1910). Together with The Herring Net and Breezing Up, painted the same year and also depicting the hard lives of fishermen in Maine, it is considered among his best works on such topics.

== Background ==
After initially making his reputation with paintings on themes related to the Civil War, in the late 1860s and through the 1870s Winslow Homer turned instead to painting people relaxing and at play: children, young women, genre paintings of farm and sea scenes. In 1881–82 he spent time in Cullercoats, in northeast England, where he painted the local fisherman and women. On his return to the US, he settled for good in Prout's Neck, Maine, where his father and brother had recently purchased a large amount of land. His brother had spent his honeymoon in Prout's Neck in 1875, and Winslow had visited him then. In both these locations he returned to painting the sea with more serious themes, such as the hard and dangerous lives of the fishermen and their families, and "humankind’s life-and-death struggles against the sea and the elemental power of nature."

He had a studio built for him in Prout's Neck, which was completed in 1884. Here he painted The Fog Warning, one of three paintings he completed there in 1885 depicting the lives of the local fishermen. These are considered among his best works representing the subject; the others are Lost on the Grand Banks, and The Herring Net. Many of his late paintings, like The Fog Warning, depict a single figure at sea. Another theme in many of his paintings of the fisherman's life was the bounty of the sea, which also provides the people's livelihood; the two are combined in this painting, which was originally exhibited under the title Halibut Fishing.

== Description ==
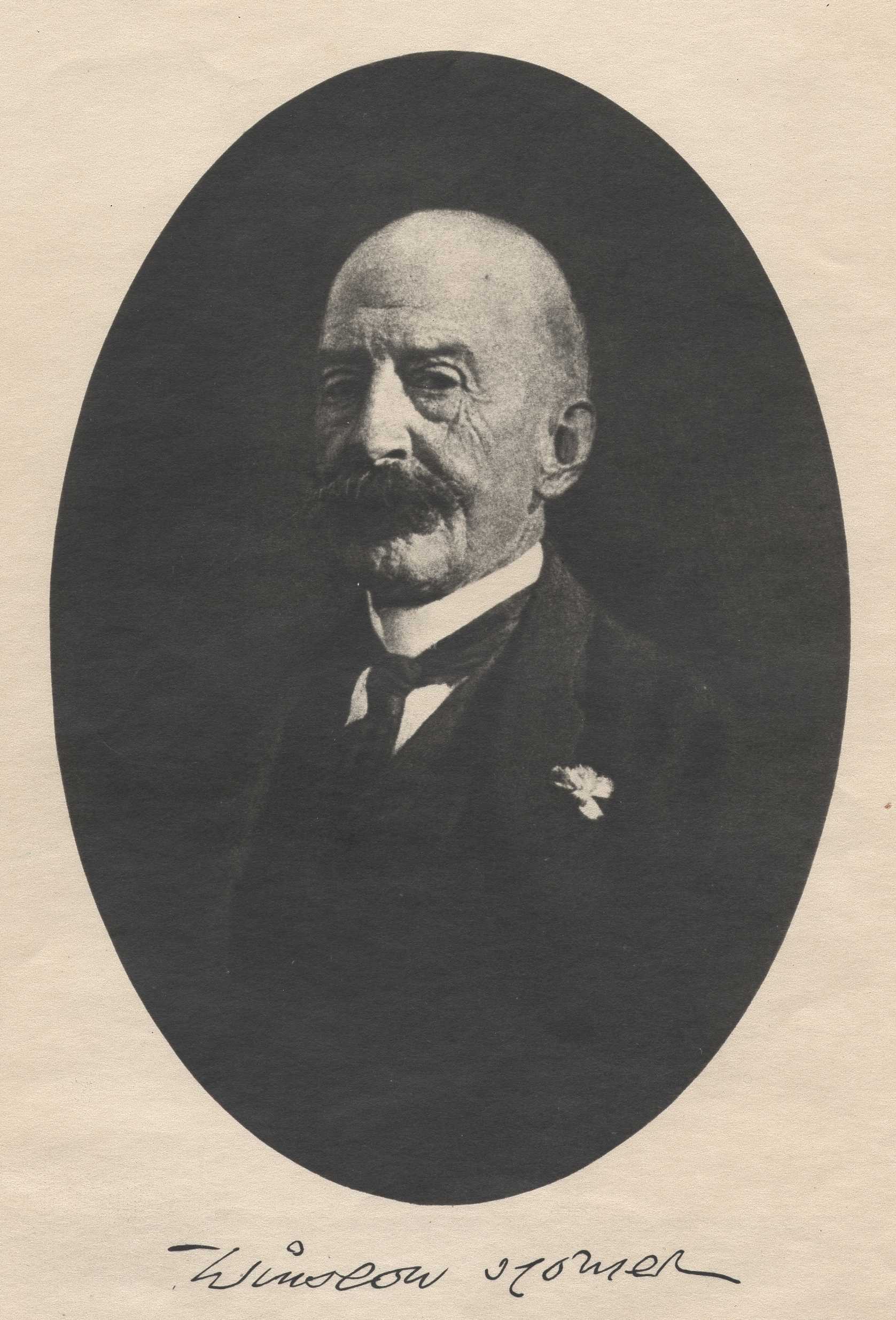
Winslow Homer in 1890

The painting depicts a lone fisherman in a dory who has caught several halibut but now sees fog blowing up, threatening to cut him off as he rows back to his ship. His face is turned in profile to the viewer as he looks over his shoulder at the clouds of fog in the background. He is in a race against the dense fog to return to the main ship with his day's work.

The Boston Fine Art Museum gives this description:

The Fog Warning is a painting with a narrative, though its tale is disturbing rather than charming. As indicated by the halibut in his dory, the fisherman in this picture has been successful. But the hardest task of the day, the return to the main ship, is still ahead of him. He turns to look at the horizon, measuring the distance to the mother ship, and to safety. The seas are choppy and the dory rocks high on the waves, making it clear that the journey home will require considerable physical effort. But more threatening is the approaching fog bank, whose streamers echo, even mock, the fisherman's profile.

The scene is psychologically tense; the risk of being lost at sea as a result of a sudden fog was all too real at the time, and the viewer does not know whether this man will reach his ship. The weight of the halibut in the stern of the boat is slowing him down, but if he decides to leave his catch behind he will not get paid for his work. The picture has been used in elementary-school education to teach about interpretation of art and fishermen's lives.

== Interpretation ==
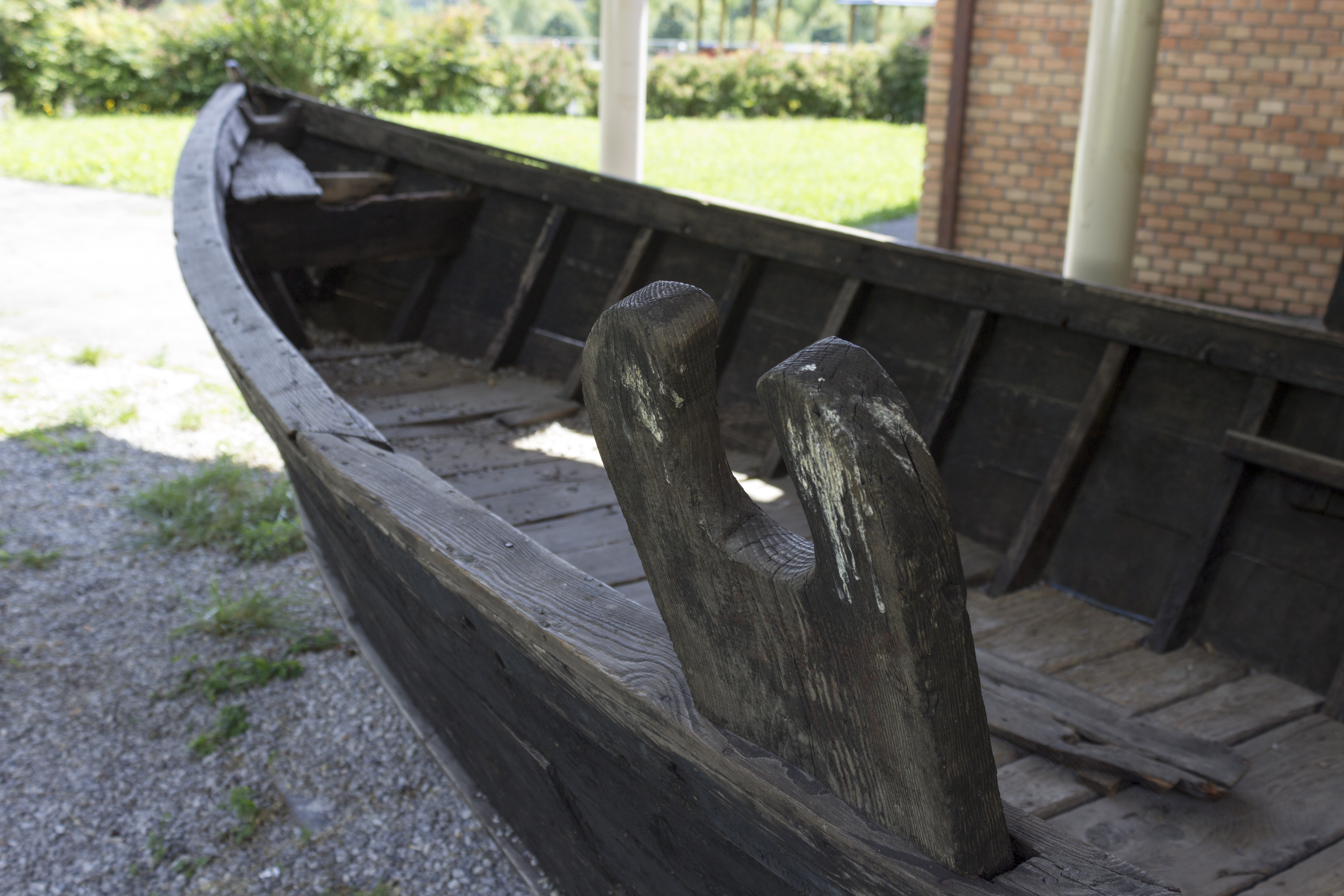
"Tholepin" of dory, also known as a rowlock

Several studies for the painting survive, among them a more intimate, less monumental version called Halibut Fishing. Homer's handyman Henry Lee posed for the painting in a dory supported on a pile of sand. In 1886 this work was originally displayed in Boston at Doll and Richards Gallery with the title Halibut Fishing. The original sketch was discovered in Homer's studio after his death. This painting depicted the fisherman facing the viewer rather than gazing out to the nearing fog, with emphasis more on the act of fishing.

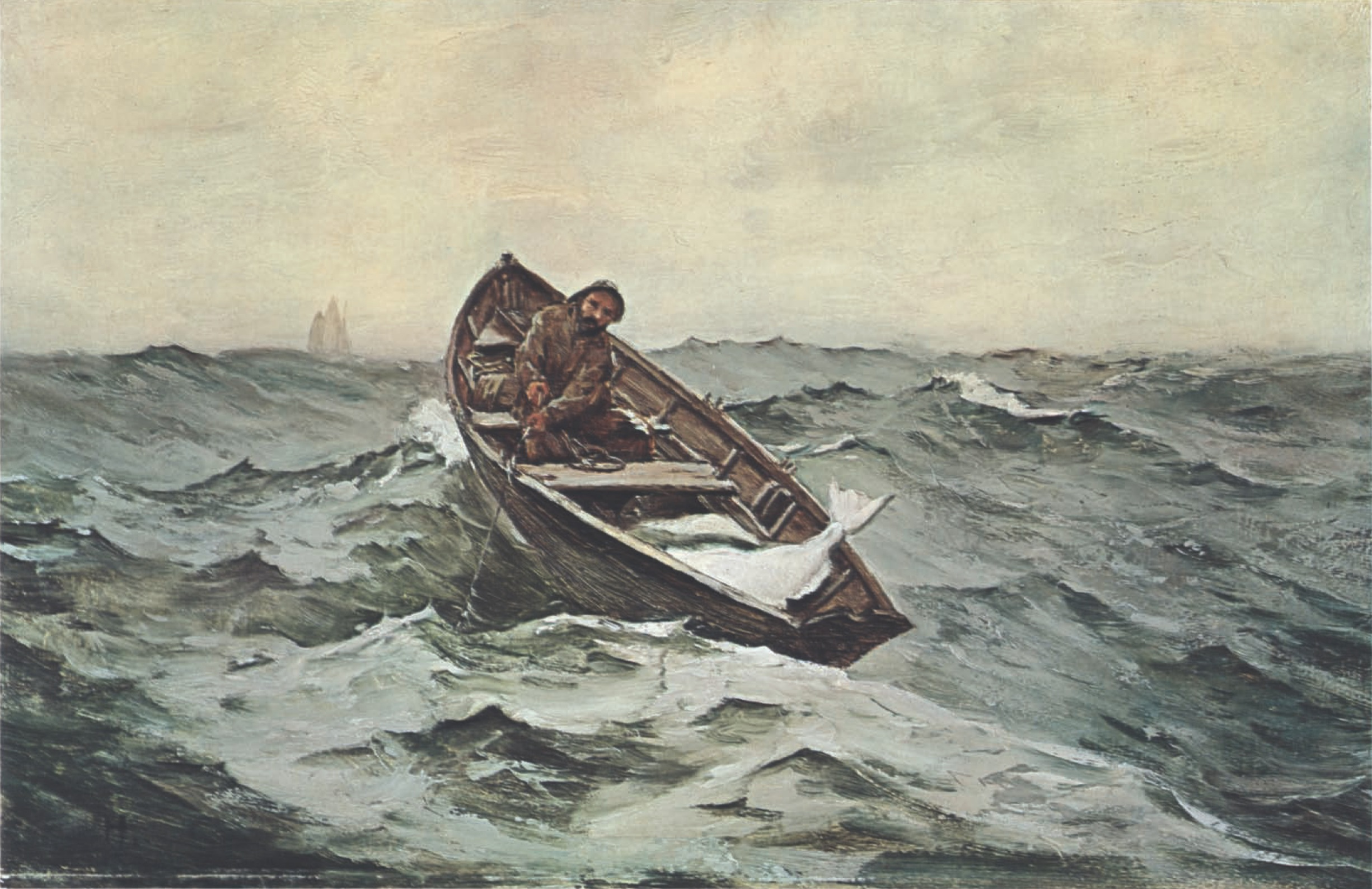
Halibut Fishing, 1880s

Before Homer added the dark shadows of the fog in the background, the original work emphasized the fisherman's focus on reeling in another fish to bring back to his boat. The fisherman's face is directed towards the line which he is feeding through one of the tholepins on the dory. The home ship is on the horizon, but the warm tones used throughout the sky and sea suggest the painting depicts a calm scene. Homer later changed the name of this piece to better depict the narrative of the relationship between the fisherman and the fog, rather than just the action of fishing. In his final piece, the dark clouds of the fog fill the skyline, almost swallowing the home ship on the horizon. The fog obscures the sunset, emphasizing that danger is near. The fisherman now appears in profile gazing towards the fog and the ship he must get back to. Homer replaced the fishing line in the tholepins with two oars, and added the detail of the anchor in the bow of the boat. The mood shifts in this final piece from calm to dangerous as darker shades of blue are added to the sea and the sky. The added details shift the meaning of this work to emphasize the dangerous life of a Maine fisherman when nature takes control.

== Thematically related works ==
In addition to Herring Nets and Breezing Up, which share the focus on Maine fishermen, Homer's Lost on the Grand Banks (also 1885) and After the Hurricane, Bahamas 1899 depict tragedy at sea: the former shows another fisherman in mortal danger at sea, the latter depicts one thrown up on shore dead. In contrast, in Summer Night (1890) the sea is raging in the background while in the middle ground people silhouetted against the waves watch, but in the foreground two girls are dancing, unconcerned. Similarly in The Gulf Stream (1899), violent waves and sharks surround the drifting boat, but the man lies across the stern, again, unconcerned about the possible dangers.

Other marine paintings by Winslow Homer

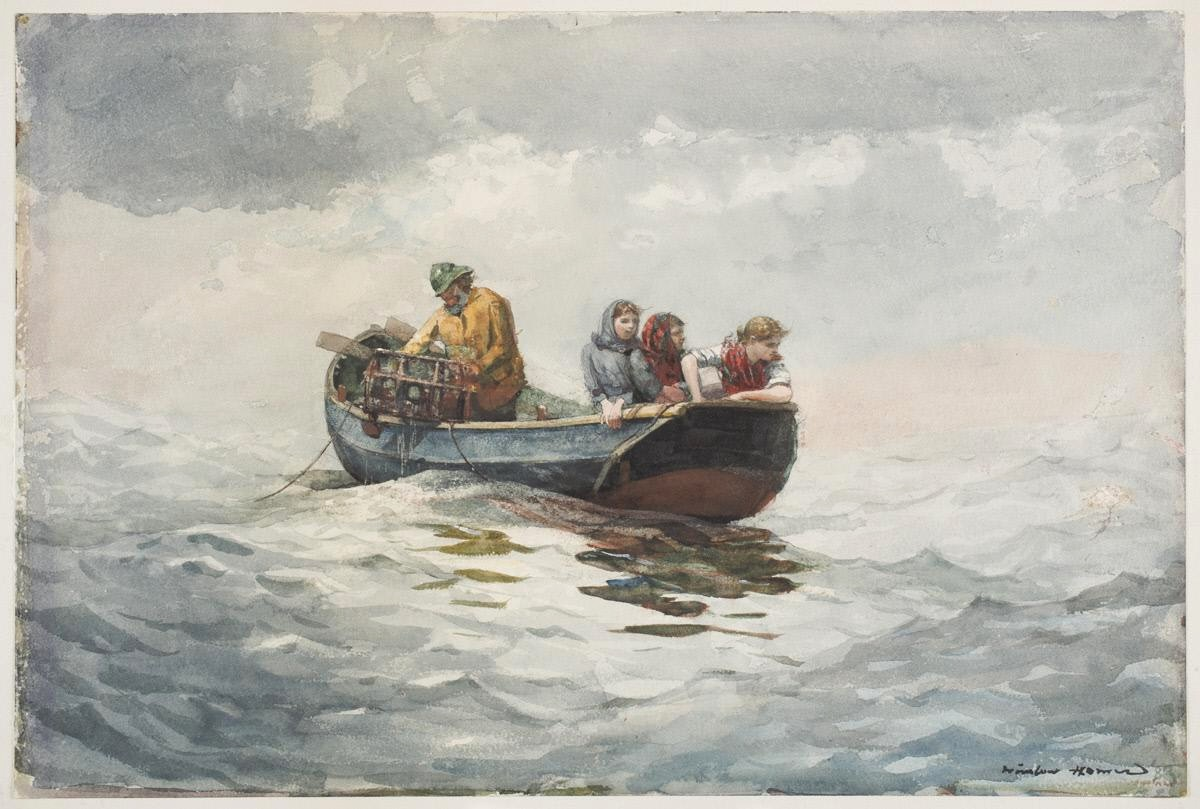
Crab Fishing, 1873

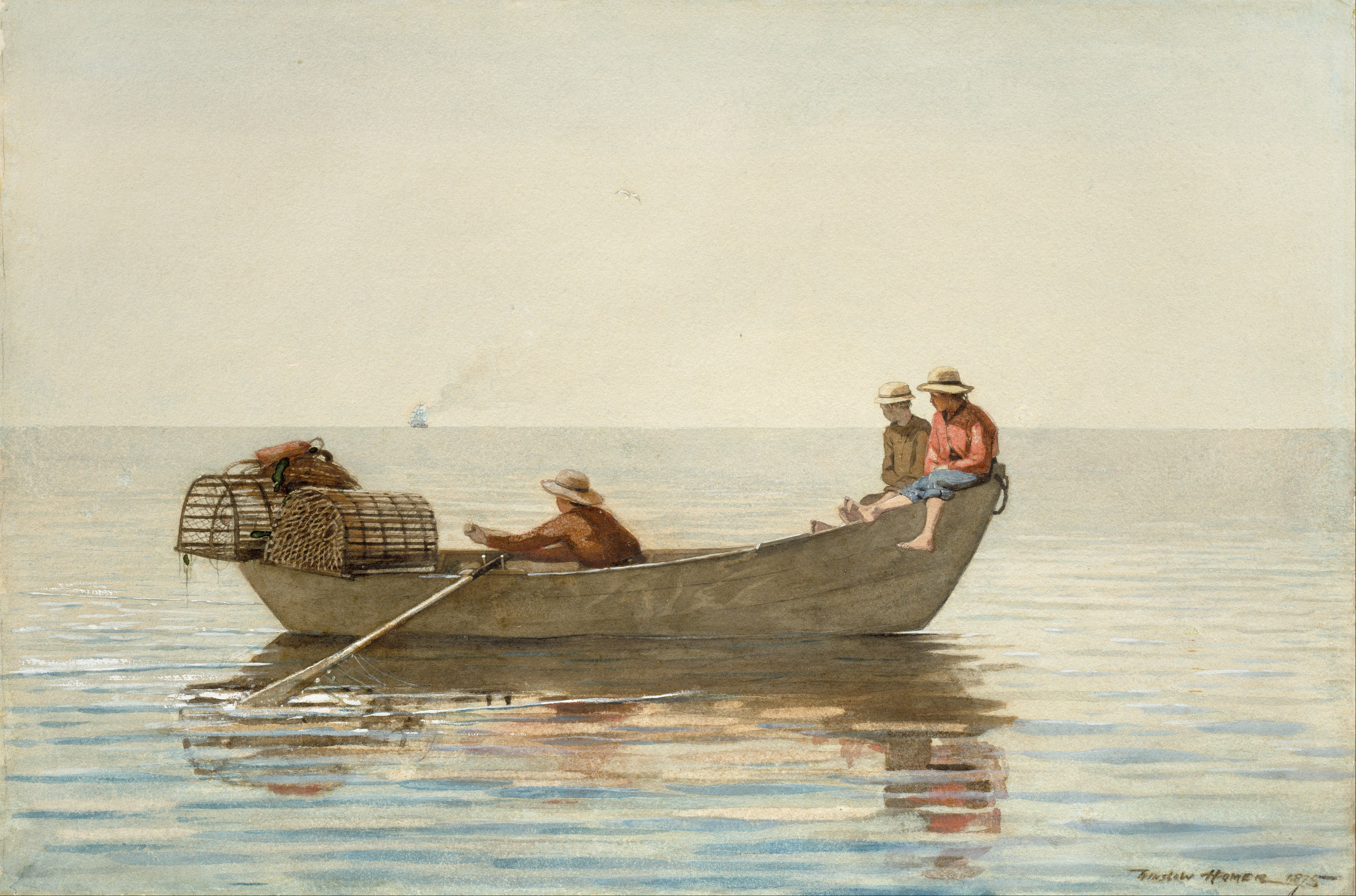
Three Boys in a Dory with Lobster Pots, 1875

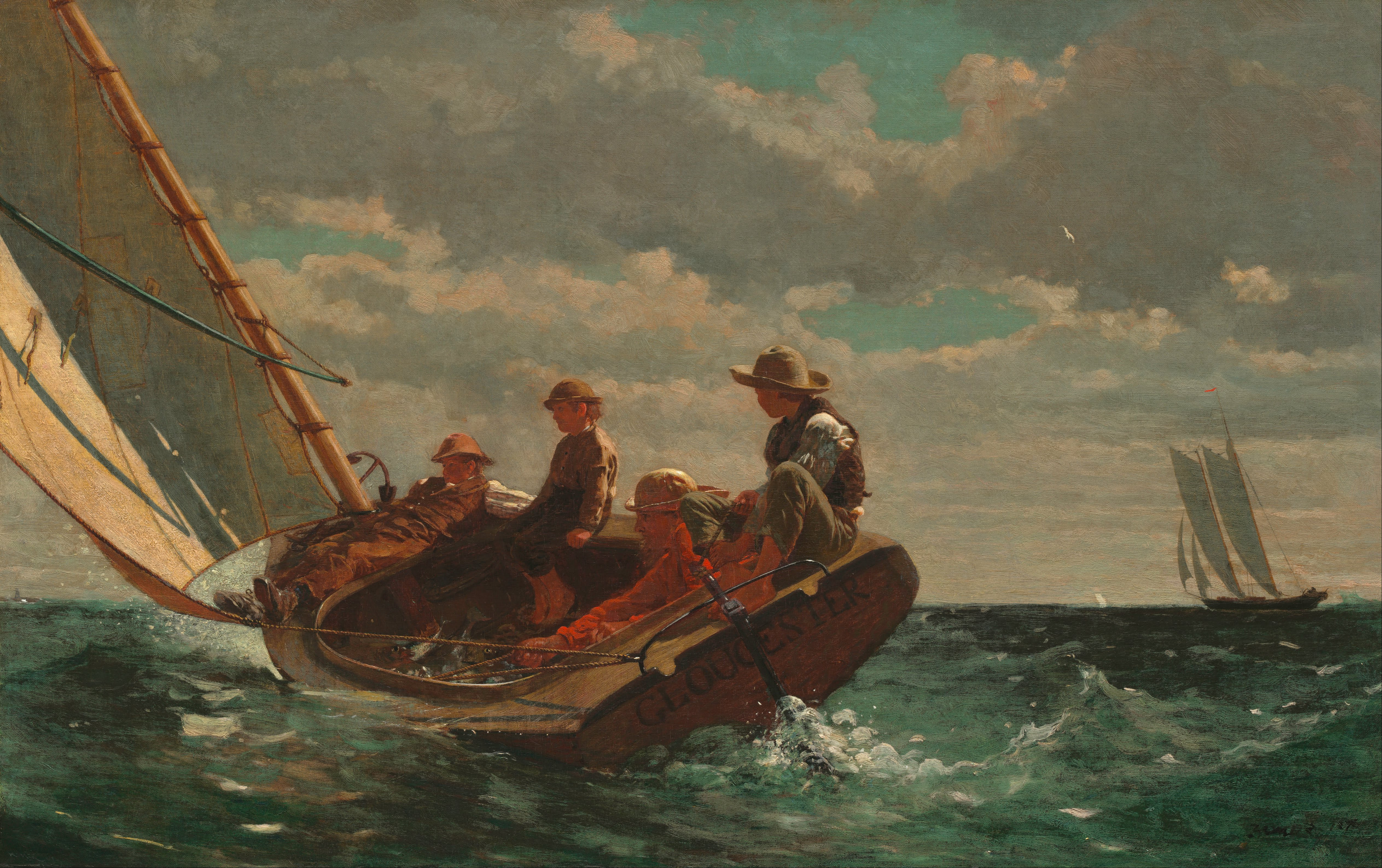
Breezing Up (A Fair Wind), 1876

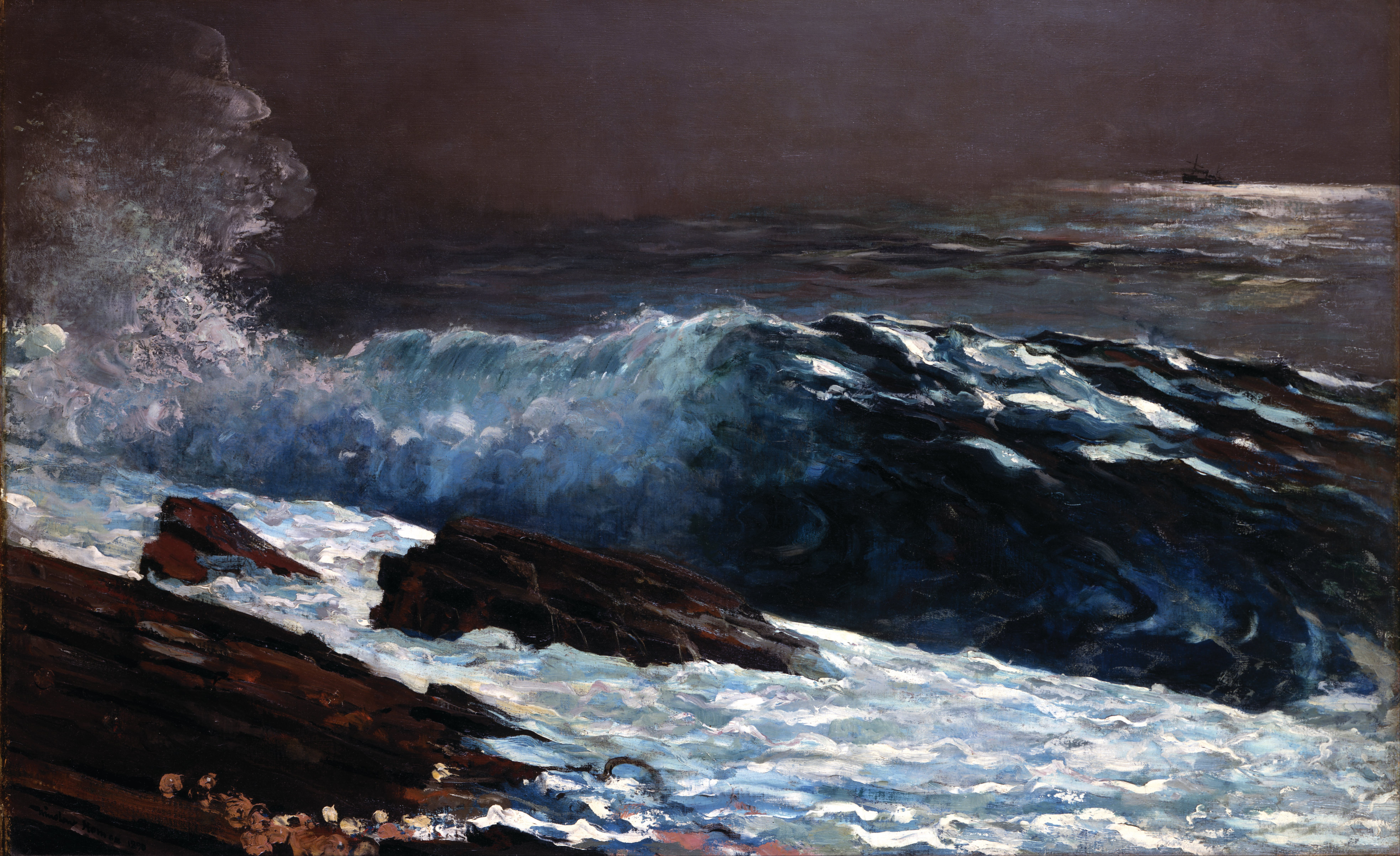
Sunlight on the Coast, 1884

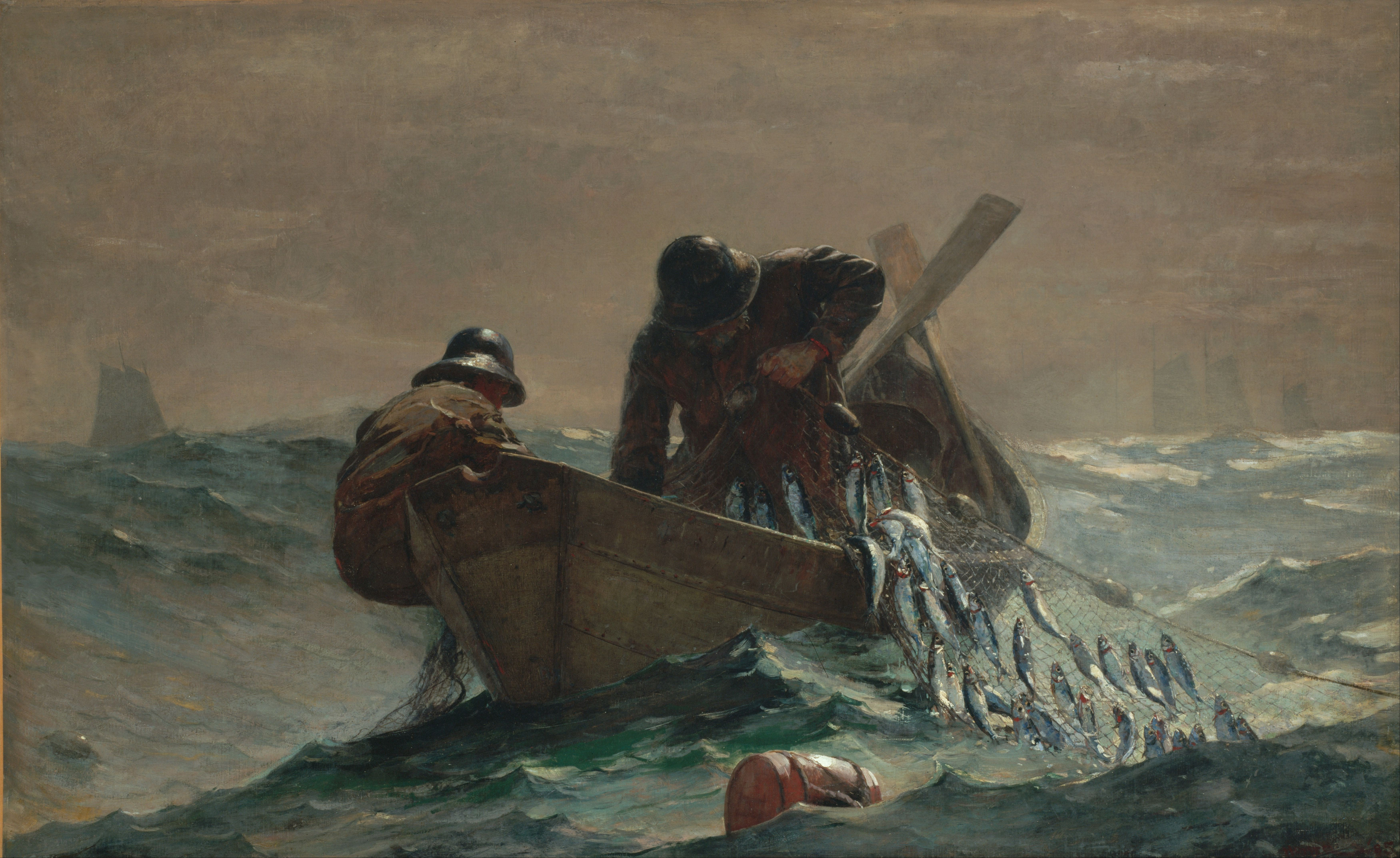
The Herring Net, 1885

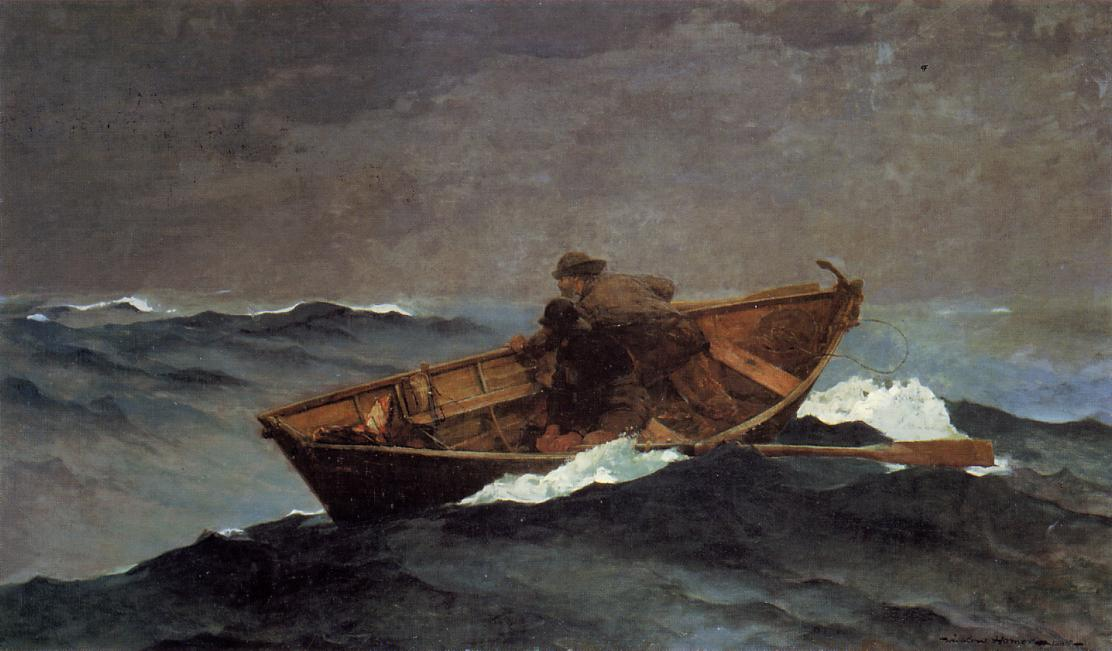
Lost on the Grand Banks, 1885

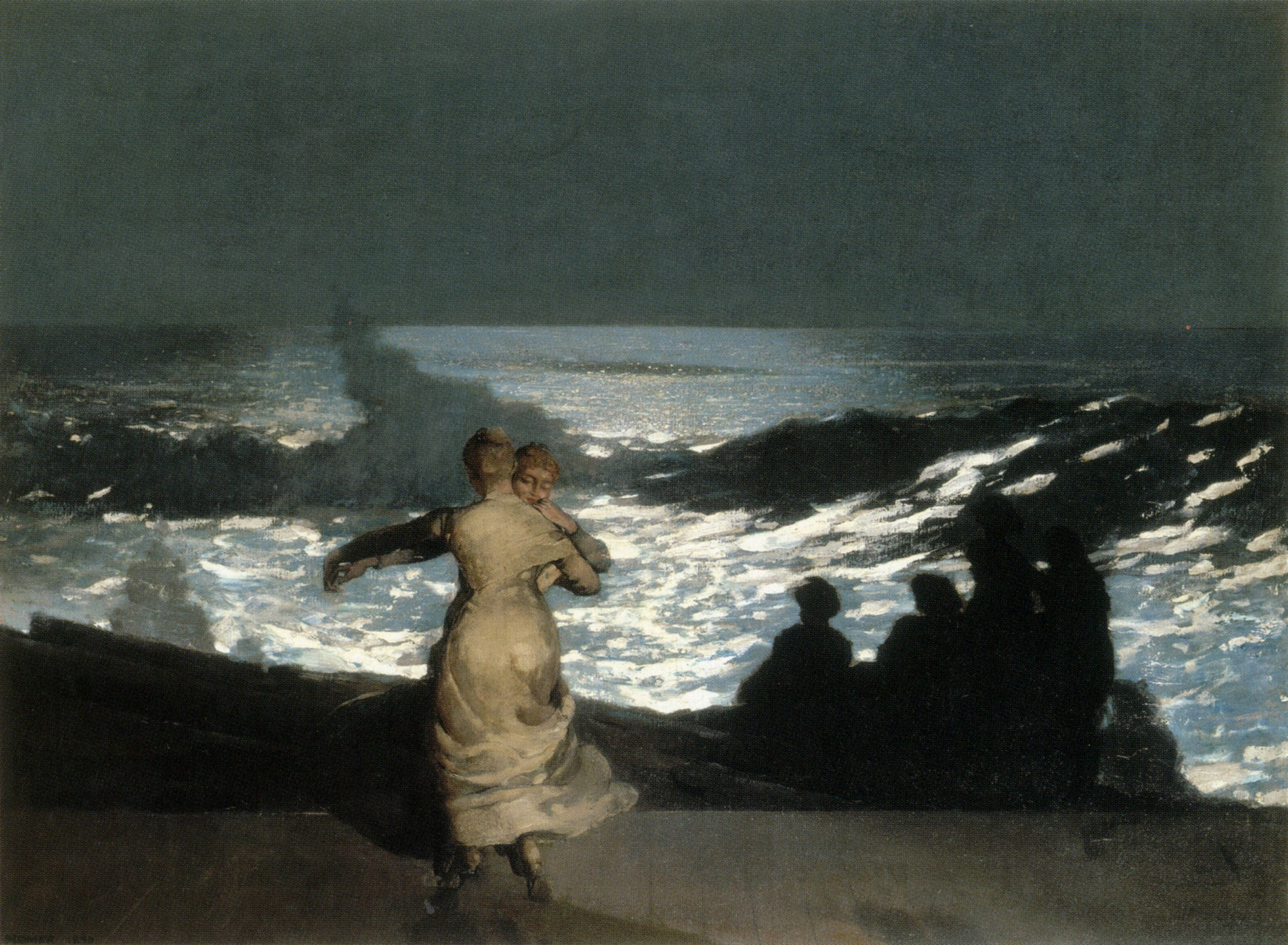
Summer Night, 1890

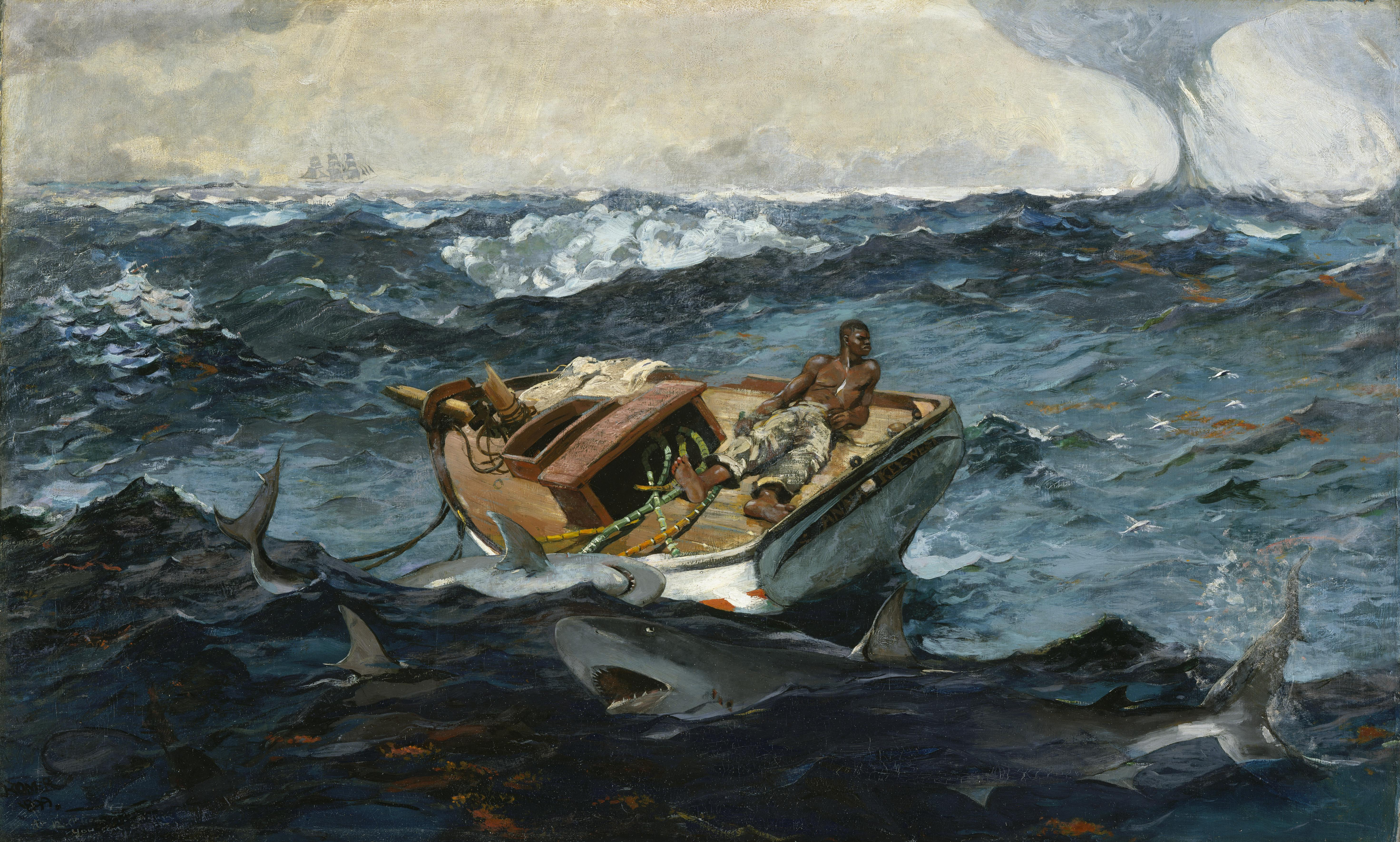
The Gulf Stream, 1899

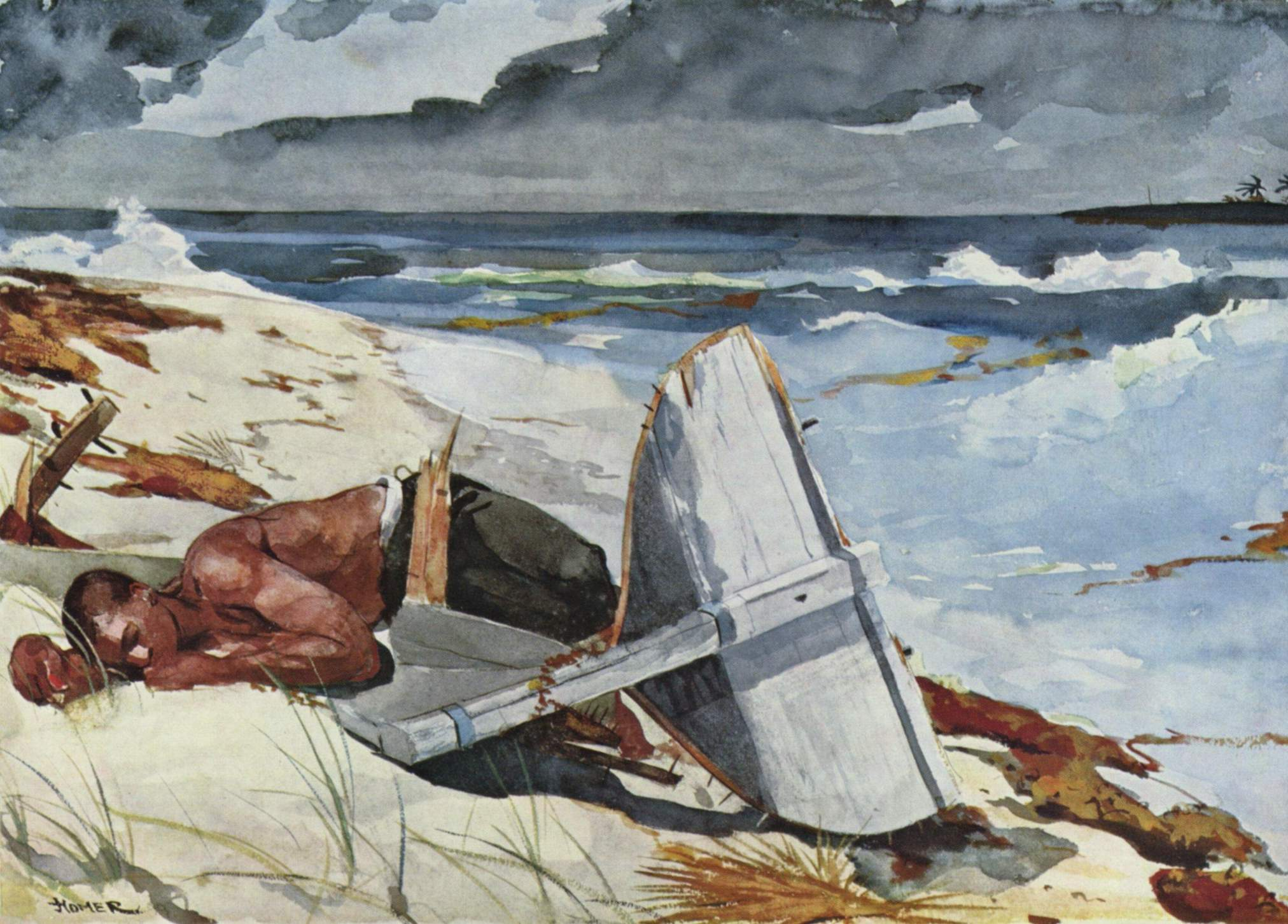
After the Hurricane, Bahamas 1899

== See also ==
- List of paintings by Winslow Homer
