= Dory Shop Museum =

Museum in Nova Scotia, Canada

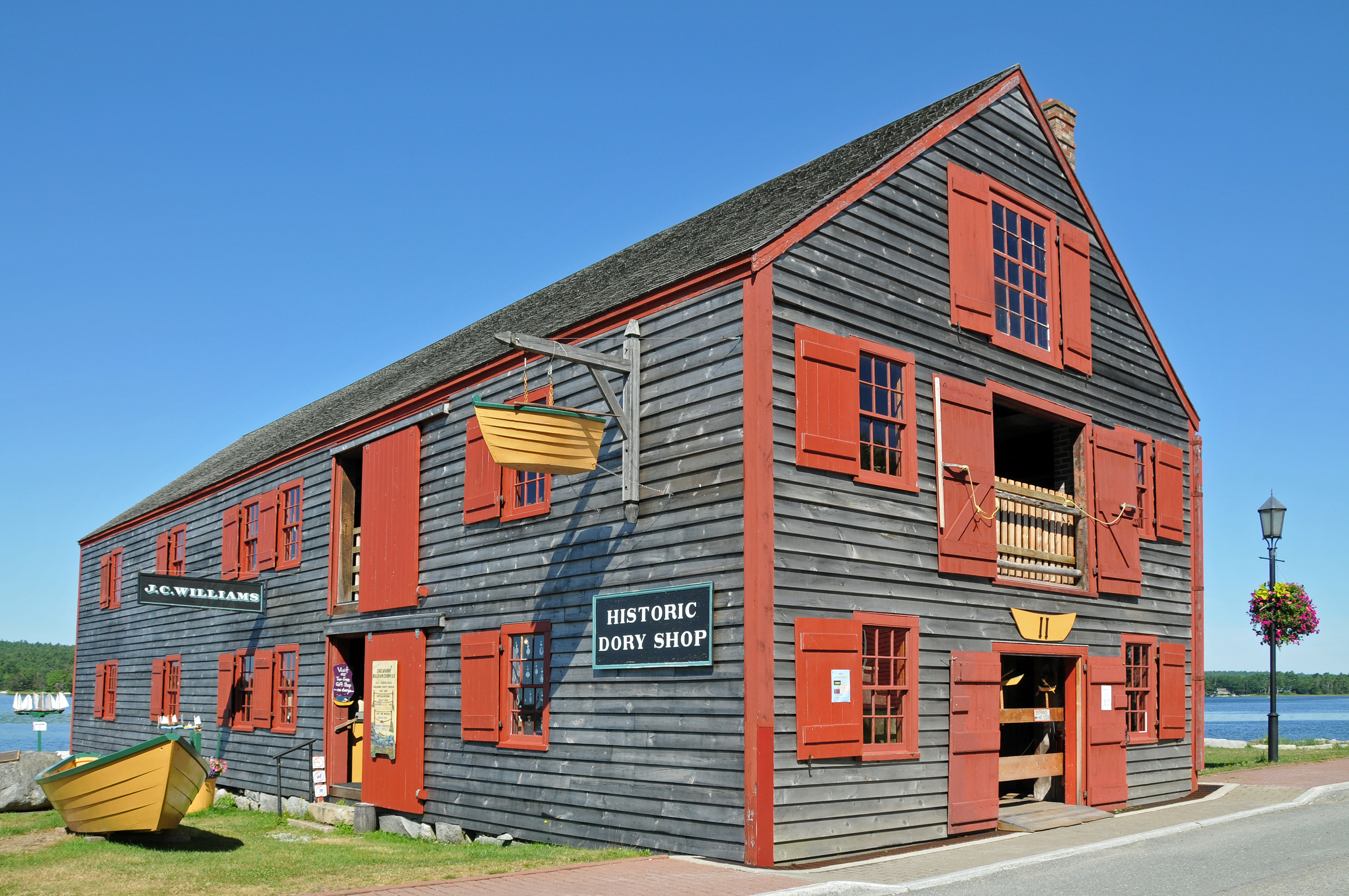
- The museum in 2011
- Established: 16 June 1983
- Location: Shelburne, Nova Scotia, Canada
- Coordinates: 43.7606932°N 65.324109°W
- Owner: Nova Scotia Museum
- Website: doryshop.novascotia.ca

The Dory Shop Museum is a Canadian museum and dory manufacturer in Nova Scotia. Constructed in 1883 by John Williams, the property was purchased by the Province of Nova Scotia in 1979 and operates under the Nova Scotia Museum. The Dory Shop is the last remaining dory manufacturer in the province.

== History ==
The Dory Shop was erected in Shelburne in 1883 by John Williams. Williams' shop was one of seven prosperous dory manufacturers in Shelburne during the peak of the fisheries industry, and the town had earned a reputation for its dories by 1860. Shelburne dories became famous after the boatbuilder Isaac Crowell invented a special clip for joining floor futtocks in 1887, and Shelburne thus enjoyed a thriving shipbuilding and fishing industry. The Dory Shop is the last of these industrial buildings still standing. In 1979, the property was purchased by the Province of Nova Scotia and subsequently opened to the public under the operation of the Nova Scotia Museum.

The Dory Shop Museum officially opened on 16 June 1983 by Charles, Prince of Wales and Diana, Princess of Wales while they were visiting Shelburne. In 1998, a 12-foot dory from the shop was sent to Ottawa to join the collection of the National Museum of Science and Technology. The Dory Shop was used as a backdrop in the 1995 film The Scarlet Letter.

In 2020, Canada Post was asked to consider featuring the Dory Shop Museum on a postage stamp. The museum celebrated its 40th anniversary in 2023, and the shop continues to produce dories. It is the only remaining dory shop in Nova Scotia.

== See also ==
- List of museums in Nova Scotia
