= Dismasting =

Loss of a sailing ship's mast

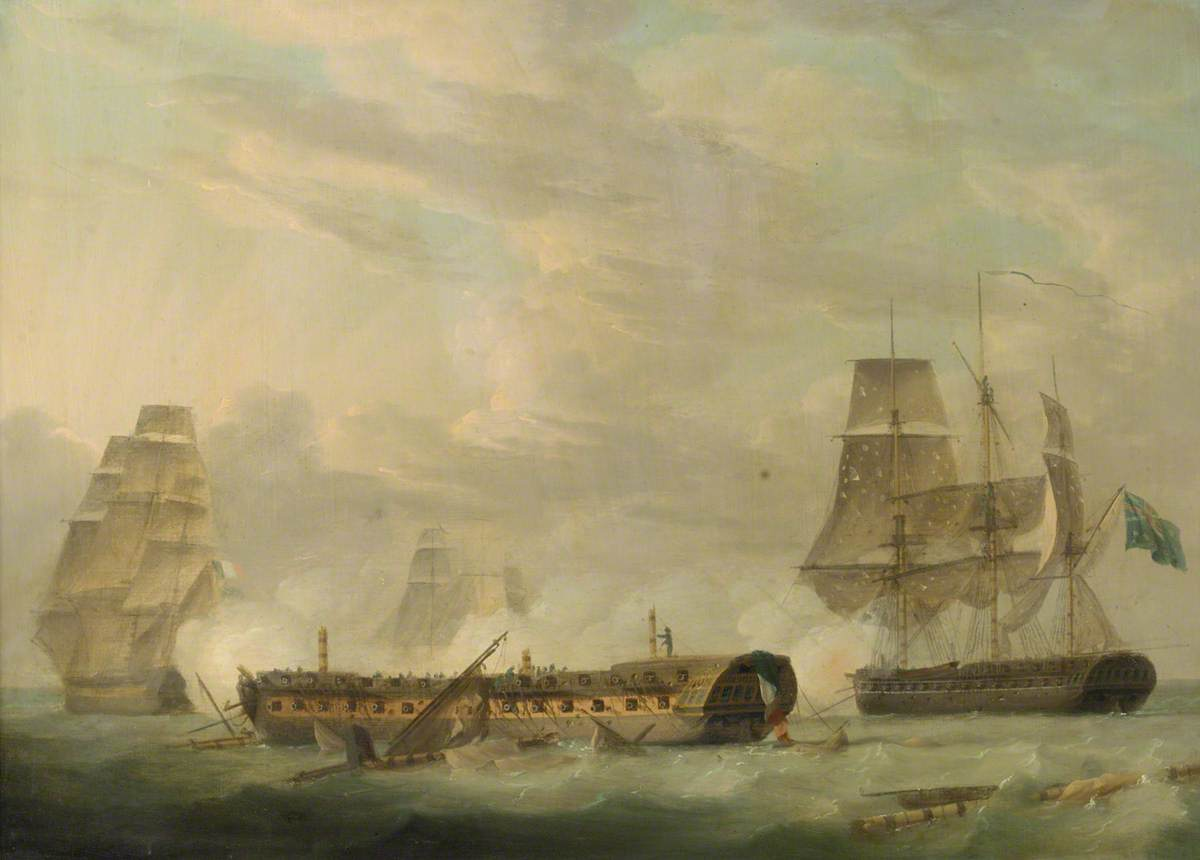
Action at sea, a French frigate completely dismasted, by Robert Dodd

Dismasting, also called demasting, occurs to a sailing ship when one or more of the masts responsible for hoisting the sails that propel the vessel breaks. Dismasting usually occurs as the result of high winds during a storm acting upon masts, sails, rigging, and spars.

Over-compression of the mast due to the rigger being over-tightened, as well as g-forces caused by wave action and the boat swinging back and forth, can also result in a dismasting. Dismasting does not necessarily impair the vessel's ability to stay afloat, but rather its ability to move under sail power. Frequently, the hull of the vessel remains intact, upright and seaworthy.

Modern masts are usually made of aluminum, carbon fibre, or other high-strength materials. These masts are subject to huge forces and tensions during high wind, large seas, or racing situations, and it is not uncommon even today for modern masts to be lost.

== Factors contributing to dismastings ==
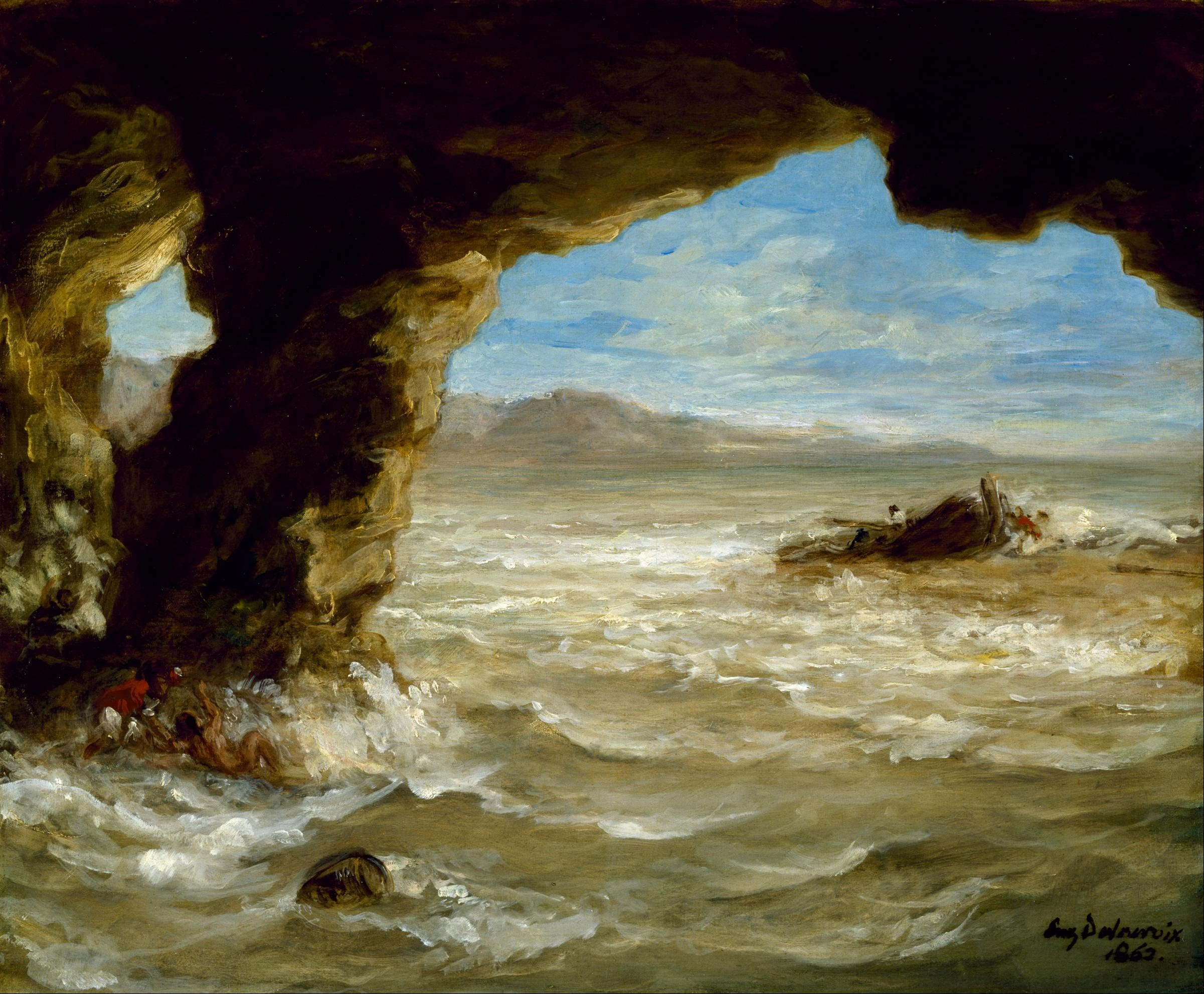
Shipwreck on the Coast by Eugène Delacroix, 1862. The painting features a small vessel that has been completely dismasted close to a rocky coastline.

Dismastings occur for many reasons. They tend to occur more prevalently for certain types of sailors, in particular areas, and particular types of sailing vessel. Having too much sail out for the weather conditions is perhaps the number one cause of dismastings. Novice and racing sailors in particular are more likely be flying more sail cloth area than more experienced, and non-racing sailors. Areas where sudden weather changes and wind shifts are frequent are more risky than areas where winds tend to be more consistent. For this reason sailing vessels in areas with consistently high winds may suffer fewer dismastings than vessels where winds are normally light but can suddenly change to very intense when a squall occurs.

Dismasting typically are commonly described as a failure when the rigging and sails go faster than the hull. Most dismastings occur due to a failure of standing rigging parts. Periodic checks o all components will go a long way toward avoiding the problem.

Dismastings owing to rigging failures tend to occur either very soon after a vessel is launched or soon after the rigging has been modified from the original design. This is particularly true for custom designed vessels. Production vessels on the other hand benefit from all the experience of similar vessels that have the same mast and rigging. One particular problem identified has been changes in rigging cables from a smaller to a larger size. Larger diameter cables produce far more compression forces on the mast when they appear to be taunt. This in turn causes the mast to collapse in column owing to over compression. Older rigging is also the source of problems since the older the rigging is the more likely corrosion has damaged the integrity of metals. Stainless steel rigging in particular has been cited as being problematic since out strands of a wire rope might appear to be fine while at the same time inner strands are compromised. For this reason many insurance companies insist that rigging holding the mast upright, termed the standing rigging, must be replaced every 10 years.

The Morning After Trafalgar by Clarkson Stanfield, 1863. It depicts the dismasted Spanish ship San Ildefonso following the Battle of Trafalgar

Heeling characteristics of the sailing vessel are also a contributing factor. Some vessels are more apt to lean away from the wind and "spill" a sudden wind gust harmlessly. The more likely a vessel tends to heel, the more a sudden strong wind gust is said to spill out of the sails because the vessel leans out of the way. A vessel that heels easily is termed as being tender whereas a vessel with a larger counter weight down low in the water, called the ballast, is termed as being stiffer. Racing vessels tend to be stiffer and spill the wind less and hence are at a greater risk of dismastings. However, it is also not good if a vessel is too tender. A very tender vessel can be easily rolled by a wave and flip completely upside down. Dismastings have occurred after a sailboat has been rolled. The extreme resistance of the water causes the failure to occur.

Multi-hull sailboats, namely catamarans and trimarans, are particularly prone to dismastings. These types of vessels don't readily spill a sudden wind gust for a different reason. It is their wide beam that causes their sails to remain closer to vertical in the face of strong wind. The wider the vessel's beam the more likely the extreme loads. Therefore, since trimarans tend to be wider than catamarans they also tend to be more prone to dismastings owing to extreme loads. It is not as if designers fail to recognize these facts. A multi-hull vessel will typically have a much stronger mast and stronger rigging than a mono-hull of the same size.

G-force loads is one of the less common reasons for a dismasting, however, it is still a real risk for both types of sailing vessels. Very stiff mono-hulls with a strong righting force tend to return to a near upright position much faster after being heeled by a strong gust of wind. This causes the motion to much more jerky. The mast will come to a sudden stop when the vessel returns to near upright when the wind fills the sails again. The problem is the mass of the mast still has momentum. Multi-hulls don't suffer g-forces caused by the wind to the same degree. Instead they are far more susceptible to g-force load owing to wave action. Waves coming abeam, i.e. striking the vessel sideways pick up and drop each hull of the vessels. If the amplitude of the wave and frequency of the waves corresponds to a factor similar to the distance between the hulls even relatively short waves can cause a dismasting. Trimarans in particular are prone to this type of dismasting since this type of vessel can rock back and forth between being supported on the center hull and one of the two ama at one second, and the center hull and the other ama the next. This violent rocking in turn translates to extreme g-force shocks on the rigging caused by the weight of the mast swinging back and force. Hence a trimaran can be dismasted even if no sails are up at all and waves are not extreme.

A particular travel direction of a sailing vessel is also more likely to lead to a dismasting. When a sailing vessel is traveling downwind, there is a chance the vessel may jibe. An accidental jibe in particular occurs when a sailing vessel is traveling downwind and the boom of the main sail suddenly swings from being on one side of the vessel to the other. The boom will come to a sudden halt when the rope controlling the boom's position becomes taunt again. At roughly the same moment the wind will fill the mainsail and a shock load will transfer into the mast and rigging and a dismasting might occur. To help prevent accidental jibes, sailors will frequently tie a line to the end of the boom to secure the boom to one side of the vessel. This line is typically called the jibe preventer.

== Consequences ==
The dismasting of a vessel can be immediately life-threatening as a consequence of a mast falling atop crew or passengers. For example, two deaths and several injuries occurred in Hawaii owing to a dismasting in 2007 and another in 2009. These incidents resulted in more stringent enforcement of safety standards for commercially operating sailboats. A dismasting can also endanger lives after the mast has fallen. The reason is the broken tangle of mast, rigging, and sails usually remains attached to the vessel owing to the rigging. If waves bash a large broken mast section against a relatively thin modern hull, the entire vessel can be lost. Therefore, it is frequently imperative for crew members to go out of the relative safety of the interior and into the same stormy conditions that caused the dismasting. There they must cut away the mess without becoming entangled in the lines, and without getting blown or knocked off the deck into the sea. To assist in this effort, many sailboats will carry a large pair of bolt cutters, extra hack-saws, or hydraulic cutters for just such an emergency. Crew also have to go onto deck to confirm there are no ropes or lines being dragged in the water that could wrap around a propeller before starting any internal combustion engine as a secondary means of propulsion.

Dismastings are rarely life-threatening after the initial event and the broken mast is cut away. However, dismastings appear to have contributed to the loss of life at sea as a consequence of crews abandoning an otherwise perfectly seaworthy vessel in favor of a life raft. This has led to a sailing adage to always "Step up into the life raft". In other words, to never abandon the sailboat unless it is confirmed that it is really sinking.

After a dismasting, the crew might jury rig, or fashion, a makeshift mast(s) and sails from salvaged and spare materials carried aboard. This would allow limited propulsion and navigational control. If the ship managed to make landfall near forests with suitable wood, new masts could be constructed from the locally available material. The masts of a sailing ship should be regularly inspected and replaced if necessary due to storm damage and normal wear. Most ocean-going ships would carry a large supply of rope, sailcloth, and even spars for ordinary and extraordinary repairs. Spinnaker poles and mizzen booms may even be used. A man-of-war would expect to carry out additional repairs due to battle damage.

== Dismastings in literature and films ==
In Herman Melville's seminal novel, "Moby Dick," Captain Ahab is said to have been, "...dismasted off Japan," alluding to Ahab's leg having been taken off by the white whale and replaced with a polished whale-bone peg-leg. "but like his dismasted craft, he shipped another mast without coming home for it. He has a quiver of 'em."

== See also ==
- Stars & Stripes (America's Cup syndicate)
