= Cape Islander =

Style of fishing boat

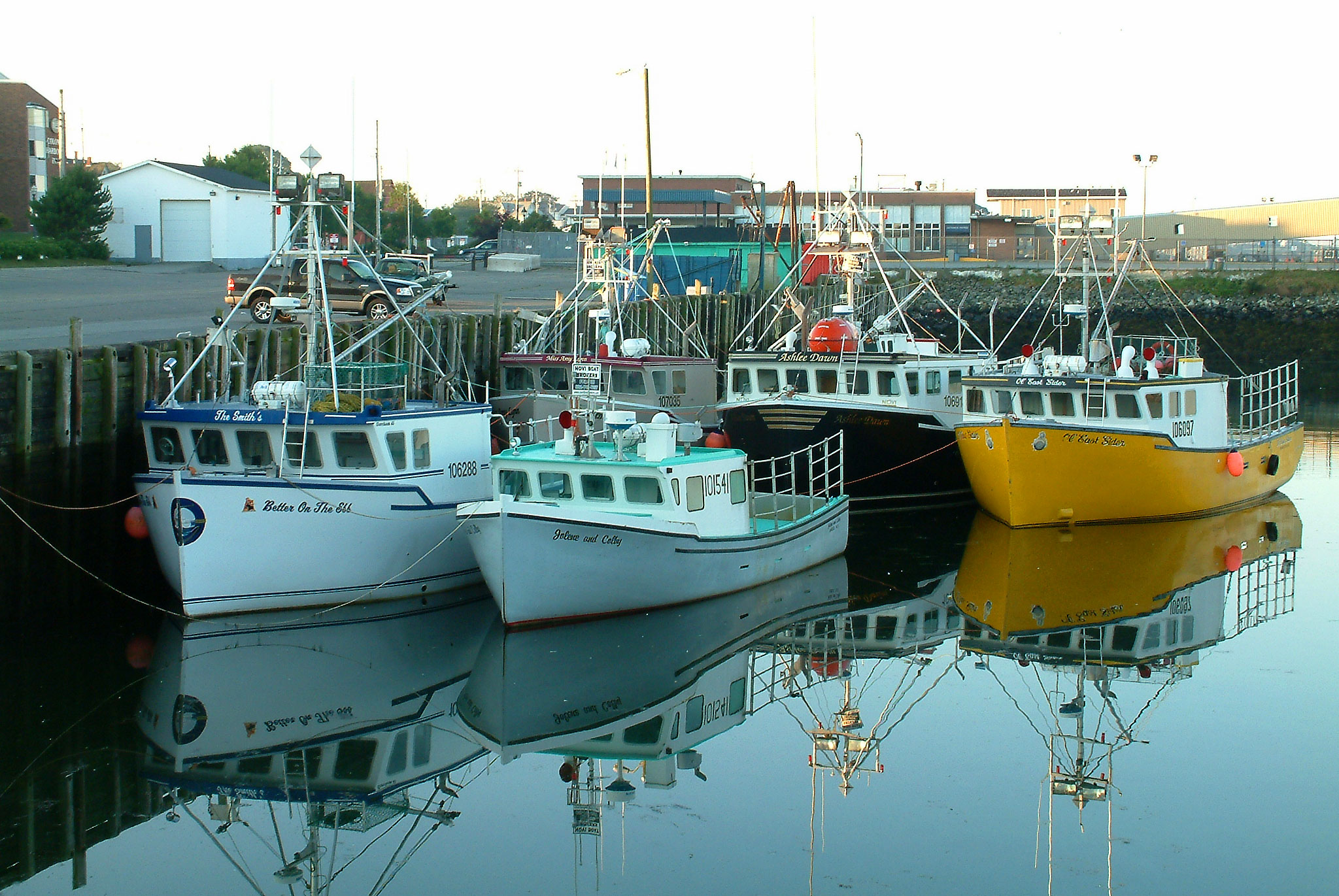
Cape Islanders in Yarmouth, Nova Scotia.

A Cape Islander, a style of fishing boat mostly used for lobster fishing, is an inshore motor fishing boat found across Atlantic Canada having a single keeled flat bottom at the stern and more rounded towards the bow. The Cape Island style boat is famous for its large step up to the bow. They are known for being good "sea" boats, and riding the swells well.

It originated on Cape Sable Island, Nova Scotia (known locally as Cape Island to distinguish it from the similarly named Sable Island, also in Nova Scotia) about 1905–1907 with two families claiming credit for its invention. The design is most commonly credited to Ephraim Atkinson of Clark's Harbour, Nova Scotia. The Atkinson family builders have continued building pleasure and commercial boats to this day. The other claim to the boat's design is an accomplished boat-builder from Clark's Harbour, William A. Kenney, who is said to have constructed the first Cape Islander entirely from wood in 1905. The Cape Sable and Pubnico area of South West Nova Scotia remain major centres of Cape Islander construction for the Atlantic region using newer materials, larger sizes (notably an increased beam) and more advanced equipment.

Beginning as an open motor-powered boat, Cape Islanders gradually evolved a covered wheelhouse called the "cuddy" which grew in size to provide bunks and a small galley space forward of the wheelhouse in the raised bow area.

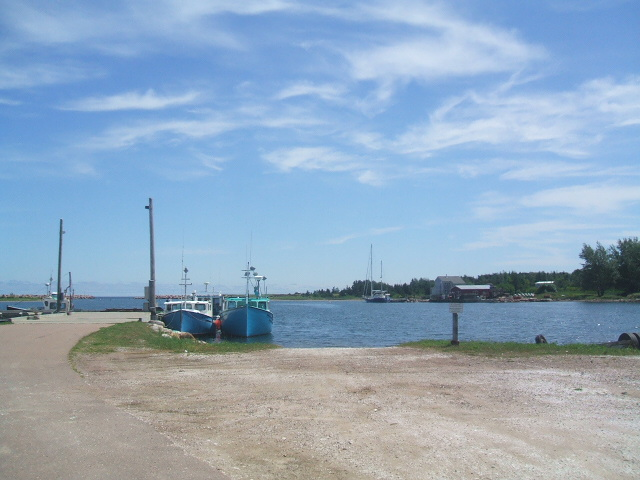
Cape Islander fishing vessels in northern Cape Breton in 2010

This boat can now be seen in use all over coastal Nova Scotia, North America, and the world. It is closely related to the Maine lobster boat. Cape Island style fishing boats are also sometimes referred to as "Novi" boats. Slight regional variations include flared bow lines for Cape Islanders in the choppy Northumberland Strait area and smaller sizes in the Eastern Shore area.
