= Swampscott dory =

Traditional American wooden fishing boat

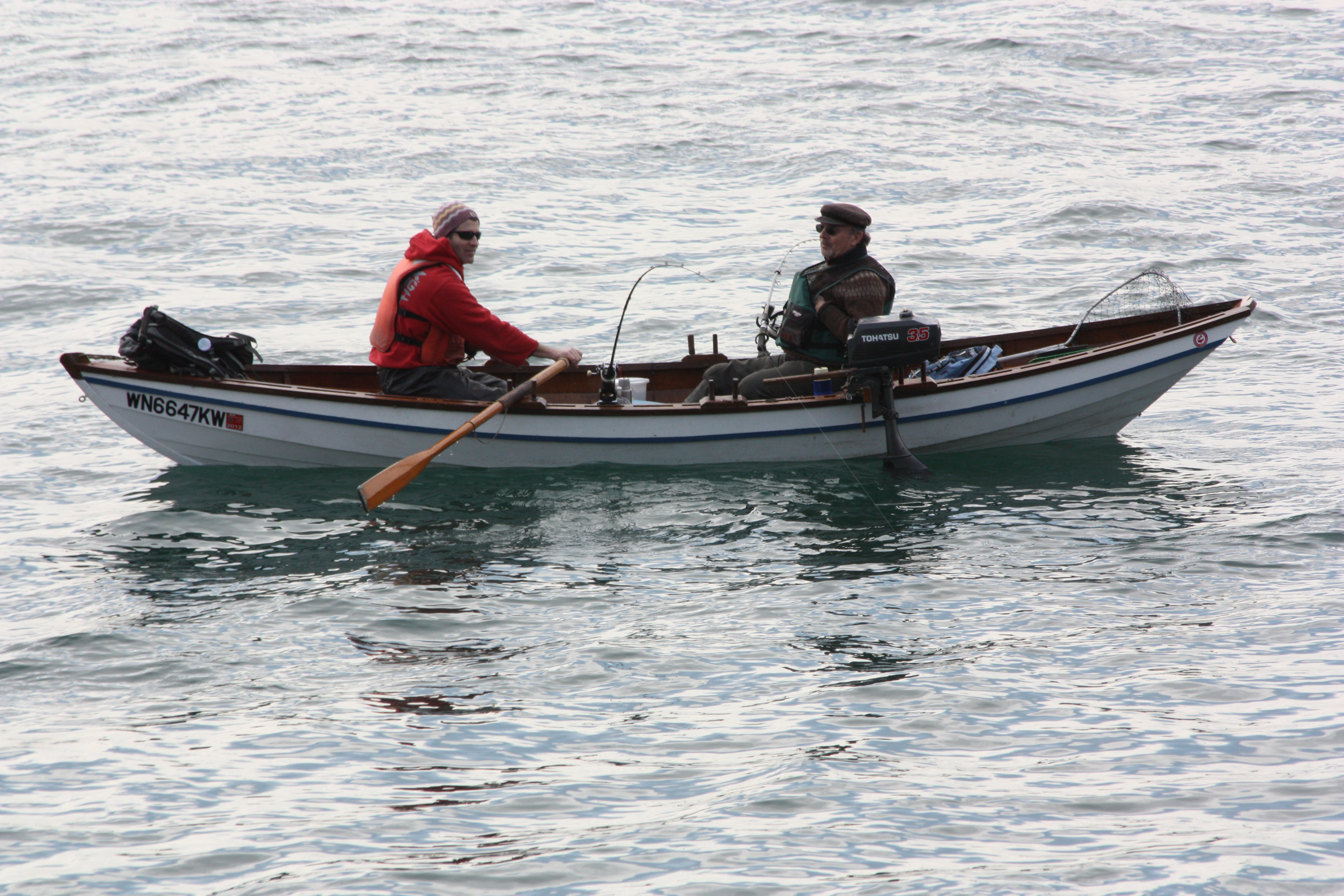
Fishing from a dory

The Swampscott dory is a traditional fishing boat, used during the middle of the 19th century by fishing villages along the North Shore coast of Massachusetts centered on Swampscott. It is designed to be launched off the beach. The rounded hull provides more buoyancy for launching through surf than the slab sided banks dory. The flat bottom allows the boat to sit upright on the beach. The lack of a keel keeps the boat from being grabbed by a wave and allows the boat to pass cleanly through the surf. The boat still heels easily which allows large fish to be rolled into the boat vs having to lift the fish completely up over the gunnel. The Swampscott Dory, a fishing boat still in use throughout the world today, was invented in 1840 by Theophilius Brackett to row and to pull lobster pots. These dories compare favorably with the New Bedford whaleboat and the Gloucester seine boat.

The Swampscott dory is a melding of the earlier Wherry design and the river bateau, which later led to new construction techniques used in the mass production of the Banks dory. Swampscott dories are built with rounded sides and slightly less overhang stern than a banks dory. Swampscott dories are generally from 14 to 18 ft in length, the longer boat being crewed by two oarsmen.

Eventually the Swampscott dory developed into a recreational sailboat as well, known as the clipper dory, and then the alpha and beachcomber dory. These inexpensive sailboats were raced along the coast of Massachusetts during the early part of the 20th century. The sail rig was typically a Leg of Mutton and small jib on an unstayed mast.

According to Gardner, Swampscott dorys are the "aristocrats of the dory clan and not to be confused with their clumsier, more crudely built cousins, the heavy, slab-sided working dories of the Grand Banks fishermen." He feels that the Swampscott dory rows and handles more easily, and are every bit as good seaboats.

Lowell's Boat Shop, one of the original builders of dories, markets a similar boat as a surf dory.
